= List of songs composed by Burton Lane =

Burton Lane (1912–1997) was an American composer. He chiefly composed songs for musical theater and films.

Each song written for a work is listed under the work in which it was first used, or, if it was never used, under the work for which it was written.

A lyricist given once for an entire work refers only to Lane's compositions for that work. That is, other composers may have written songs for that work with different lyricists.

== Songs ==
=== 1930s ===
Artists and Models (revue, 1930, lyrics by Sammy Lerner)

- "My Real Ideal"
- "Two Perfect Lovers"

"As Long As You're Near Me" (1930, lyrics by Sammy Lerner)

Three's a Crowd (revue, 1930)

- "Forget All Your Books" (music reused from "As Long As You're Near Me", lyrics by Howard Dietz and Sammy Lerner)
- "Out in the Open Air" (lyrics by Howard Dietz and Ted Pola)

"Under Vesuvian Skies" (1930, lyrics by Edgar Leslie)

The Third Little Show (revue, 1931)

- "Say the Word" (lyrics by Harold Adamson)

Earl Carroll's Vanities (revue, 1931, lyrics by Harold Adamson)

- "Going to Town With Me"
- "Have a Heart"
- "Heigh Ho the Gang's All Here"
- "Love Came into My Heart" (cut after opening)
- "The Mahoneyphone"
- "Masks and Hands"
- "Oh My Yes" (cut after opening)
- "Cute Peekin' Knees (not in program)

Singin' the Blues (play with music, 1931)

- "Crazy Street" (lyrics by Harold Adamson)

Americana (revue, 1932)

- "You're Not Pretty but You're Mine" (lyrics by Yip Harburg)

"Lucky Little Accident" (1932, lyrics by Joe Young)
"Look Who's Here" (1932, lyrics by Harold Adamson)

Dancing Lady (film, 1933, lyrics by Harold Adamson)

- "Everything I Have Is Yours"
- "Let's Go Bavarian"

Long Lost Father (film, 1933)

- "It Isn't So Much That I Wouldn't" (lyrics by Harold Adamson)

"Stringin' Along on a Shoe-String" (1933, lyrics by Harold Adamson)
"Tony's Wife" (1933, lyrics by Harold Adamson)

The Band Plays On (1934)

- "Roll Up the Score" (lyrics by Harold Adamson)

Bottoms Up (film, 1934, lyrics by Harold Adamson)

- "Turn On the Moon"
- "I'm Throwing My Love Away"
- "Little Did I Dream"
- "Bottoms Up"

Coming Out Party (film, 1934)

- "I Think You're Wonderful" (lyrics by Harold Adamson)

Kid Millions (film, 1934, lyrics by Harold Adamson)

- "Your Head on My Shoulder"
- "I Want to Be a Minstrel Man" (music reused for "You're All the World to Me")

Palooka (film, 1934)

- "Like Me a Little Bit Less" (lyrics by Harold Adamson)

Strictly Dynamite (film, 1934, lyrics by Harold Adamson)

- "Swing It Sister"
- "Oh Me! Oh My! Oh You!"

A Wicked Woman (film, 1934, lyrics by Harold Adamson)

- "In Louisiana"
- "In the Hash in the Stew"

Baby Face Harrington (film, 1935)

- "Hiking" (lyrics by Harold Adamson)

Folies Bergère de Paris (film, 1935)

- "You Took the Words Right Out of My Mouth" (lyrics by Harold Adamson)

Gypsy Night (short film, 1935)

- "Ivan's Song" (lyrics by Richard Goldstone and Harold Adamson)
- "Yascha & Sacha" (lyrics by Harold Adamson)

Here Comes the Band (film, 1935)

- "I'm Bound for Heaven" (lyrics by Harold Adamson)
- "The Army Band" (lyrics by Harold Adamson)
- "You're My Thrill" (lyrics by Ned Washington)
- "Here Comes the Band" (lyrics by Harold Adamson) (not used)

The Perfect Gentleman (film, 1935)

- "It's Only Human" (lyrics by Harold Adamson, not used)

Reckless

- "Hear What My Heart Is Saying" (lyrics by Harold Adamson)

Shadow of Doubt (film, 1935, lyrics by Harold Adamson)

- "Beyond the Shadow of a Doubt"

College Holiday (film, 1936)

- "The Sweetheart Waltz" (lyrics by Ralph Freed)
- "Minstrel Show Opening" (lyrics by Ralph Freed)
- "Who's That Knockin' at My Heart" (lyrics by Ralph Freed)
- "What a Pleasure to Work With You" (lyrics by Leo Robin, not used)

Every Saturday Night (film, 1936)

- "Breathes There a Man" (lyrics by Herb Magidson)

"Guess Who" (1936, lyrics by Ralph Freed)
"'Taint No Use" (1936, lyrics by Herb Magidson)

Artists and Models (film, 1937, lyrics by Ted Koehler)

- "Pop Goes the Bubble (And Soap Gets in My Eyes)"
- "Stop! You're Breaking My Heart"

Blonde Trouble (film, 1937)

- "It Was All in Fun" (lyrics by Ralph Freed)

Champagne Waltz (film, 1937)

- "When Is a Kiss Not a Kiss?" (lyrics by Ralph Freed)

Dancing on the Ceiling (short film, 1937, lyrics by Harold Adamson)

- "Locker Room Sequence"
- "See Your Dentist Once a Day"
- "Walking on the Ceiling"

Double or Nothing (film, 1937)

- "Smarty (You Know It All)" (lyrics by Ralph Freed)
- "Listen My Children And You Shall Hear" (lyrics by Ralph Freed)

Her Husband Lies (film, 1937, lyrics by Ralph Freed)

- "You Gambled With Love"
- "No More Tears"

Hideaway Girl (film, 1937, lyrics by Ralph Freed)

- "Dancing Into My Heart"
- "Two Birdies Up a Tree"

King of Gamblers (film, 1937)

- "I'm Feelin' High" (lyrics by Ralph Freed)

Partners of the Plains (film, 1937)

- "Moonlight on the Sunset Trail" (lyrics by Ralph Freed)

Swing High, Swing Low (film, 1937)

- "Swing High, Swing Low" (lyrics by Ralph Freed, but used instrumentally only)

This Way Please (film, 1937)

- "Speaking of Love" (lyrics by Ralph Freed, not used)

Wells Fargo (film, 1937)

- "Where I Ain't Been Before" (lyrics by Ralph Freed)

Cocoanut Grove (film, 1938)

- "Says My Heart" (lyrics by Frank Loesser)
- "Ten Easy Lessons" (composed by "Jock" (Jack Rock) and Lane, lyrics by "Jock" and Frank Loesser)
- "Swami Song" (lyrics by Alfred Santell)

College Swing (film, 1938, lyrics by Frank Loesser)

- "Moments Like This"
- "How'dja Like to Love Me"
- "What Did Romeo Say To Juliet"

Give Me a Sailor (film, 1938, lyrics by Frank Loesser)

- "I'm in the Pink" (unused)
- "Am I the Lucky One" (unused)
- "I'm in Dreamland" (unused)

Love on Toast (film, 1938)

- "I Want a New Romance" (lyrics by Sam Coslow)

Stolen Heaven (film, 1938)

- "Born to Swing" (lyrics by Ralph Freed) (unused)

A Song Is Born (short film, 1938)

- "Love Doesn't Grow on Trees" (lyrics by Ralph Freed)

Spawn of the North (film, 1938)

- "I Wish I Was the Willow" (lyrics by Frank Loesser)
- "I Like Humped-Back Salmon" (lyrics by Frank Loesser)
- "Under the Midnight Sun" (lyrics by Sam Coslow)

Cafe Society (film, 1939)

- "Kiss Me With Your Eyes" (lyrics by Frank Loesser, same music and lyricist as "Do You Ever Dream")

Flight at Midnight (film, 1939)

- "I Never Thought I'd Fall in Love Again" (lyrics by Ralph Freed)

She Married a Cop (film, 1939, lyrics by Ralph Freed)

- "I Can't Imagine"
- "I'll Remember"
- "Here's to Love"

Some Like It Hot (film, 1939)

- "The Lady's in Love with You" (lyrics by Frank Loesser)

St. Louis Blues (film, 1939, lyrics by Frank Loesser)

- "Oh, You Mississippi"
- "Junior"
- "Blue Nightfall"
- "The Song in My Heart Is a Rhumba"
- "Don't Cry Little Cloud" (not used)
- "She Was Wearing a Big Sombrero" (not used)
- "It's Grand" (not used)

=== 1940s ===
Hold On to Your Hats (musical, 1940, lyrics by Yip Harburg)

- "Don't Let It Get You Down"
- "Down on the Dude Ranch"
- "Hold Onto Your Hats"
- "Life Was Pie for the Pioneer"
- "Old-Timer"
- "She Came, She Saw, She Can-Canned"
- "Then You Were Never in Love"
- "There's a Great Day Coming, Manana"
- "Walking Along Mindin' My Business"
- "Way Out West Where the East Begins"
- "The World Is In My Arms"
- "Would You be So Kindly"
- "Bedtime on the Prairie" (cut)
- "Looks Like I'm Off O' Ya" (cut)
- "Swing Your Calico" (cut)
- "Crispy, Crunch Crackers" (never used)

Dancing on a Dime (film, 1940, lyrics by Frank Loesser)

- "Dancing on a Dime"
- "I Hear Music"
- "Mañana"

Babes on Broadway (film, 1941)

- "Babes on Broadway" (lyrics by Ralph Freed)
- "Anything Can Happen in New York" (lyrics by Ralph Freed)
- "Chin Up, Cheerio, Carry On" (lyrics by Yip Harburg)
- "How About You?" (lyrics by Ralph Freed)
- "Blackout Over Broadway"
- "Tap It Out" (not used)

Las Vegas Nights (film, 1941, lyrics by Frank Loesser)

- "I Gotta Ride"
- "Mary, Mary, Quite Contrary"
- "I'll Never Smile Again" (not written for this film)

Her Cardboard Lover (film, 1942, lyrics by Ralph Freed)

- "I Dare You"
- "With Your Looks and My Brains"

Panama Hattie (film, 1942)

- "The Son of a Gun Who Picks on Uncle Sam" (lyrics by Yip Harburg)

Seven Sweethearts (film, 1942)

- "Tulip Time" (lyrics by Ralph Freed)

Ship Ahoy (film, 1942)

- "I'll Take Tallulah" (lyrics by Yip Harburg)
- "The Last Call for Love" (lyrics by Margery Cummings and Yip Harburg)
- "Poor You" (lyrics by Yip Harburg)

Du Barry Was a Lady (film, 1943)

- "Du Barry Was a Lady" (lyrics by Ralph Freed)
- "Madam, I Love Your Crepe Suzette" (lyrics by Lew Brown and Ralph Freed)

Presenting Lily Mars (film, 1943)

- "Tom, Tom the Piper's Son" (lyrics by Yip Harburg)

Thousands Cheer (film, 1943)

- "I Dug a Ditch in Wichita" (lyrics by Lew Brown and Ralph Freed)

Hollywood Canteen (film, 1944)

- "What Are You Doin' the Rest of Your Life" (lyrics by Ted Koehler)
- "You Can Always Tell a Yank" (lyrics by Yip Harburg)

Laffing Room Only (revue, 1944, lyrics by Burton Lane)

- "The Doolittle Hop" (cut out of town)
- "Feudin' and Fightin'" (lyrics by Burton Lane and Frank Loesser)
- "Go Down to Boston Harbor"
- "Got That Good Time Feelin'"
- "Gotta Get Joy" (lyrics by Al Dubin)
- "The Hellzapoppin Polka"
- "Hooray for Anywhere"
- "Mother Mississippi"
- "The Steps of the Capitol"
- "Stop That Dancing"
- "Sunny California"
- "This Is As Far As I Go"
- "Two on an Island"
- "You Excite Me"

Meet the People (film, 1944)

- "It's Smart to be People" (lyrics by Yip Harburg)

Rainbow Island (film, 1944, lyrics by Ted Koehler)

- "What a Day"
- "Beloved (Aloha-Nui-Ia)"
- "Boogie Woogie Boogie Man"
- "Tomorrow"
- "We Have So Little Time"
- "New Moon" (not used)

The Great Morgan (film, 1945)

- "Thank You Columbus" (lyrics by Yip Harburg)

All-Star Musical Revue (short film, 1945)

- "Once to Every Heart" (lyrics by Ted Koehler)

Pillow to Post (film, 1945)

- "Whatcha Say" (lyrics by Ted Koehler)

Finian's Rainbow (musical, 1947, lyrics by Yip Harburg)

- "This Time of the Year"
- "How Are Things in Glocca Morra?"
- "Look to the Rainbow"
- "Old Devil Moon"
- "Something Sort of Grandish"
- "If This Isn't Love"
- "Necessity"
- "That Great 'Come-and-Get-It' Day"
- "When the Idle Poor Become the Idle Rich"
- "Fiddle Faddle"
- "The Begat"
- "When I'm Not Near the Girl I Love"

This Time for Keeps (film, 1947)

- "I Love to Dance" (lyrics by Ralph Freed)

=== 1950s ===
Huckleberry Finn (unproduced film, 1950, lyrics by Yip Harburg)

- "That Real Sunday Feeling"
- "Don't Run Mirandy"
- "Jumpin' Jubilee"

Huckleberry Finn (unproduced film, 1951, lyrics by Alan Jay Lerner)

- "I'm From Missouri"
- "Huckleberry Finn"
- "The World's Full o' Suckers"
- "I'll Wait for You Down by the River"
- "I'll Meet You Down by the River"
- "Pittsburgh Blue"
- "Asparagus Is Served"
- "When You Grown Up You'll Know"

Royal Wedding (film, 1951, lyrics by Alan Jay Lerner)

- "Ev'ry Night At Seven"
- "Open Your Eyes"
- "The Happiest Day of My Life"
- "How Could You Believe Me When I Said I Loved You When You Know I've Been a Liar All My Life?"
- "Too Late Now"
- "You're All the World to Me" (music reused from "I Want to Be a Minstrel Man")
- "I Left My Hat in Haiti"
- "What a Lovely Day for a Wedding"
- "Sunday Jumps" (cut)
- "I Got Me a Baby" (cut)

Jollyanna and The Little Doll Laughed (revisions of Flahooley, 1952, lyrics by Yip Harburg)

- "Little Bit of Magic"
- "What's Gonna Happen?"

Papa's Delicate Condition (unproduced film, 1952, lyrics by Leo Robin)

- "The Greatest Papa in the World"
- "The Way We Are"
- "Hooray for Ghio"
- "Ambolyn" (same music as "Hooray for Ghio")
- "Hoby Tyler Campaign Song"
- "Yes, Mister Cosgrove"
- "Off to Wonderland"
- "It's Love—Love—Lovely You"
- "Ki Yi Yippee Yi Yo What a Night!"

Give a Girl a Break (film, 1953, lyrics by Ira Gershwin)

- "Applause! Applause!"
- "Nothing Is Impossible"
- "Give a Girl a Break"
- "In Our United State"
- "It Happens Ev'ry Time"
- "Dream World"
- "Ach Du Lieber Oom-Pah-Pah" (not used)
- "Woman, There Is No Living With You" (not used)

Jupiter's Darling (film, 1955, lyrics by Harold Adamson)

- "I Never Trust a Woman"
- "I Have a Dream"
- "The Life of an Elephant"
- "Horatio's Narration"
- "If This Be Slav'ry"
- "Don't Let This Night Get Away"
- "Hannibal's Victory March"

Junior Miss (made-for-television musical, 1957, lyrics by Dorothy Fields)

- "Happy Heart"
- "Have Feet Will Dance"
- "I'll Buy It"
- "It's Just What I Wanted"
- "Junior Miss"
- "Let's Make It Christmas All Year 'Round"
- "A Male Is an Animal"

=== 1960s through 1990s ===
On a Clear Day You Can See Forever (musical, 1965, lyrics by Alan Jay Lerner)

- "Come Back to Me"
- "Don't Tamper With My Sister on a Publick Walke"
- "The Gout (The Spasms)" (dance)
- "The Hellrakers'" (dance)
- "Hurry! It's Lovely Up Here"
- "I'll Not Marry" (cut soon after opening)
- "Melinda"
- "On a Clear Day (You Can See Forever)"
- "On the S.S. Bernard Cohn"
- "Ring Out the Bells" (cut for the national tour)
- "She Wasn't You"
- "Tosy and Cosh" (replaced "I'll Not Marry")
- "Wait 'Til We're Sixty-Five"
- "What Did I Have That I Don't Have?"
- "When I'm Being Born Again" (cut for the national tour)
- "Dolly's Seduction" (cut in previews)
- "The Domestic Champagne Waltz" (cut in previews)
- "Mom" (cut in previews)
- "The Normal Thing to Do" (cut in previews)
- "He Wasn't You" (added for the national tour)
- "Marriage A La Mode" (added for the national tour)
- "The Solicitor's Song" (cut in previews, then added for the national tour)
- "When I Come Around Again" (replaced "When I'm Being Born Again" for the national tour)

We Bombed in New Haven (play, 1968)

- "Bomb, Bomb, Bombing Along" (lyrics by Joseph Heller)

On a Clear Day You Can See Forever (film, 1970, lyrics by Alan Jay Lerner)

- "Go to Sleep"
- "He Isn't You"
- "Love With All the Trimmings"
- "People Like Me (E.S.P.)" (cut from the final print)
- "She Isn't You" (cut from the final print)
- "Who Is There Among Us Who Knows?" (cut from the final print)

Carmelina (musical, 1979, lyrics by Alan Jay Lerner)

- "It's Time for a Love Song"
- "Why Him?"
- "I Must Have Her"
- "Someone in April"
- "Signora Campbell"
- "Love Before Breakfast"
- "Yankee Doodles"
- "I Wonder How She Looks"
- "One More Walk Around the Garden"
- "All That He Wants Me to Be"
- "Carmelina"
- "The Image of Me"
- "I'm a Woman"
- "Church" (cut)

"Where Have I Seen Your Face Before?" (1980, lyrics by Yip Harburg)

Heidi's Song (animated musical, 1982, lyrics by Sammy Cahn)

- "Good at Making Friends"
- "Wunderhorn"
- "A Christmas-y Day"
- "An Armful of Sunshine"
- "Heidi"
- "She's a Nothing"
- "Can You Imagine?"
- "An Un-kind Word"
- "That's What Friends Are For"
- "Ode to a Rat"
- "Nightmare Ballet" (instrumental)

"And Suddenly It's Christmas" (1986, lyrics by Ervin Drake)
"I Can Hardly Wait" (1990, lyrics by Alan and Marilyn Bergman)

See also Musicals by Burton Lane, Films with songs by Burton Lane and Songs with music by Burton Lane.

== Sources ==
- "Burton Lane". Discography of American Historical Recordings. University of California, Santa Barbara Library.
- Bloom, Ken (1995). Hollywood Song: The Complete Film Musical Companion. New York, NY: Facts on File. ISBN 0-8160-2002-7.
- Bloom, Ken (1996). American Song: The Complete Musical Theatre Companion (2nd ed.). New York: Schirmer Books. ISBN 0-02-864573-1.
- McHugh, Dominic; Asch, Amy (2018). The Complete Lyrics of Alan Jay Lerner. New York, NY: Oxford University Press. ISBN 978-0-19-064673-8.
- Meyerson, Harold; Harburg, Ernie (1993). Who Put the Rainbow in the Wizard of Oz?. Ann Arbor, Michigan: University of Michigan Press. p. 289. ISBN 0-472-10482-9.
