= Michael Feinstein discography =

- Studio albums: 29
- Live albums: 3
- Compilation albums: 1

The discography for American jazz singer Michael Feinstein.

- 1985 Pure Gershwin (Parnassus) – then released by Asylum in 1987
- 1986 Live at the Algonquin (Asylum)
- 1987 Remember: Michael Feinstein Sings Irving Berlin (Asylum)
- 1988 Isn't It Romantic (Asylum)
- 1989 The M.G.M. Album (Elektra)
- 1989 Over There (EMI Digital)
- 1990 Michael Feinstein Sings the Burton Lane Songbook, Vol. 1 (Elektra/Nonesuch)
- 1991 Michael Feinstein Sings the Jule Styne Songbook (Elektra/Nonesuch)
- 1992 Michael Feinstein Sings the Burton Lane Songbook, Vol. 2 (Elektra)
- 1992 Pure Imagination (Elektra)
- 1993 Michael Feinstein Sings the Jerry Herman Songbook (Elektra/Asylum)
- 1993 Forever (Elektra)
- 1995 Such Sweet Sorrow (Atlantic)
- 1995 Michael Feinstein Sings the Hugh Martin Songbook (Elektra/Asylum)
- 1996 Nice Work If You Can Get It: Songs by the Gershwins (Atlantic)
- 1998 Nobody But You (Wea International)
- 1998 Michael & George: Feinstein Sings Gershwin (Concord Jazz)
- 1999 Big City Rhythms (Concord) – #7 Billboard Jazz chart
- 2000 Romance on Film, Romance on Broadway (Concord) – #11 Billboard Independent Albums chart
- 2000 'Michael Feinstein Recorded Live at Feinstein's at the Regency (Concord Records, April 18-22, 2000)
- 2001 Michael Feinstein with the Israel Philharmonic Orchestra (Concord) – #9 Billboard Jazz chart, #33 Billboard Independent Albums chart
- 2001 With a Song in My Heart (Concord)
- 2001 An Intimate Holiday with Michael Feinstein (Concord)
- 2002 The Michael Feinstein Anthology (Elektra/Rhino)
- 2002 Livingston and Evans Songbook (Feinery)
- 2003 Only One Life: The Songs of Jimmy Webb (Concord Jazz)
- 2005 Hopeless Romantics (with George Shearing) (Concord) – #18 Billboard Jazz albums chart
- 2008 The Sinatra Project (Concord) – #3 Billboard Jazz album chart, #10 Billboard Heatseekers chart
- 2009 The Power of Two (with Cheyenne Jackson) (Harbinger) – #15 Billboard Jazz album chart, #17 Billboard Heatseekers chart
- 2010 Fly Me to the Moon (with Joe Negri) (DuckHole) – #39 Billboard Jazz album chart
- 2011 Cheek to Cheek: Cook and Feinstein (with Barbara Cook) (DuckHole)
- 2011 We Dreamed These Days (DuckHole)
- 2011 The Sinatra Project, Vol. 2: The Good Life (Concord)
- 2013 Change of Heart: The Songs of André Previn (Telarc)
- 2014 A Michael Feinstein Christmas (Concord)
- 2021 Gershwin Country (Concord)
