= Lawrence Edward Watkin =

American novelist (1901–1981)

- Born: December 9, 1901; Camden, New York, U.S.
- Died: December 16, 1981 (aged 80); San Joaquin County, California
- Occupations: Novelist; screenwriter; producer; college faculty
- Writing career
- Notable work: On Borrowed Time
- Notable awards: Bookseller Discovery National Book Award, 1937

Lawrence Edward Watkin (December 9, 1901 – December 16, 1981) was an American writer and film producer. He was known primarily as a scriptwriter for a series of 1950s Walt Disney films.

== Life ==
Watkin was born in Camden (town), New York in 1901. He received a Bachelor of Arts degree from Syracuse University in 1924 and a master's degree from Harvard in 1925. From 1926 until he entered the Navy in 1942, he was a member of Washington and Lee University's English Department in Lexington, Virginia. He died in 1981, a few days after his 80th birthday, in San Joaquin County, California.

== Writer ==
Watkin's first novel, On Borrowed Time, published in 1937 while an English professor at Washington and Lee, remains his best-known work. It won the National Book Award as Bookseller Discovery of 1937, voted by members of the American Booksellers Association. It was dramatized in 1938 by Paul Osborn for a successful run on Broadway. A Hollywood film version with Lionel Barrymore and Sir Cedric Hardwicke followed in 1939.

His next novel, Geese in the Forum (1940), was an allegory about university structures.

In 1947 Walt Disney hired Watkin to adapt the stories of Herminie Templeton Kavanagh featuring Darby O'Gill. The project was finally realized in 1959 as Darby O'Gill and the Little People. By that time, Watkin had written numerous other screenplays for Disney. The first of his Disney screenplays was Treasure Island (1950), adapted from the Robert Louis Stevenson novel. Three screenplays followed (Beaver Valley, The Story of Robin Hood and His Merrie Men, and The Sword and the Rose), which were produced by Disney in Great Britain. The popular Disney television serials Spin and Marty (1955–1957) were adapted by Jackson Gillis from Watkin's 1942 book Marty Markham. Watkin was producer of Disney's 1956 Adventure film, The Great Locomotive Chase.

In the late 1960s Watkin was hired by the Disney Studio to do a biography of Walt Disney after the first effort by Richard G. Hubler was judged unsatisfactory. Watkin's effort was also deemed unsuitable; he told friends the biography was "ill-fated" because it was "too truthful". Disney historian Wade Sampson, after reading the unpublished manuscript, dubbed it "achingly boring, with only occasional insights into the life and genius of Walt Disney and merely listing the Disney productions rather than the stories behind those productions."

== Works ==
=== Novels ===
- On Borrowed Time, New York and London 1937
- Geese in the Forum, New York and London 1940
- Thomas Jones and His Nine Lives, New York 1941
- Gentleman from England, New York 1941
- Marty Markham, New York 1942 LCCN 42-21068. The novel can be viewed at https://archive.org/details/waltdisneysspinm00watk
- Darby O’Gill and the Little People, New York 1959

=== Screenplays ===
- Keeper of the Bees (1947)
- Treasure Island (1950) – Originally by Robert Louis Stevenson
- Beaver Valley; aka In Beaver Valley (1950) - documentary short
- The Story of Robin Hood and His Merrie Men, aka The Story of Robin Hood (1952)
- The Sword and the Rose; aka When Knighthood Was in Flower (1953) – based on the novel by Charles Major
- Rob Roy, the Highland Rogue (1953
- The Great Locomotive Chase (1956) - Producer and Writer
- The Light in the Forest (1958) – Originally by Conrad Richter
- Darby O'Gill and the Little People (1959) – Originally by Herminie Templeton Kavanagh
- Ten Who Dared (1960)
- National Velvet - "The Desperado" (1961)
- The Robert Taylor Show (1963)
- The Virginian - "Portrait of a Widow" (1964)
- The Colonial Naturalist-Mark Catesby (1965) - For The Colonial Williamsburg Foundation
- The Biscuit Eater (1972)
