= Daniel Reifsnyder =

American songwriter

Daniel Reifsnyder (born June 23, 1982) is an American musician, actor, songwriter and producer. Reifsynder began writing at the age of six, being one of ASCAP's youngest published songwriters by age 10.

== Career ==
He is the brother of actor Timothy Reifsnyder. He began his career at five years old as a regular on Al Albert's Showcase, a live Saturday morning variety show based out of Philly.

As a child in the early 1990s, he began working in New York City as a jingle singer and commercial actor. His voice or image can be seen on numerous well known 1990s commercials for products including Dimetapp, Days Inn, Lego (as one of the Wright brothers), and many more. He was also known for being the voice behind the animated children in General Mills Cereal commercials (1993–97). He was on Broadway with Nathan Lane and George C. Scott in On Borrowed Time,

He originated the role of Dill in the Paper Mill Playhouse production of To Kill A Mockingbird. He is also known for playing the role of Jeremy Marver in The Babysitter's Club episode Kristy and the Great Campaign.

== Music ==
Reifsynder began writing at the age of six, being one of ASCAP's youngest published songwriters by age 10. His voice can be heard in the choir in Home Alone 2: Lost in New York, as well as on the Magic School Bus theme with Little Richard. Reifsynder has also worked with the likes of Michael Jackson, G. E. Smith, The Olsen Twins , and others.

After forming, producing, and writing for multiple projects throughout the years, he struck out for Nashville where he currently resides. In 2015 he was nominated for a Grammy Award for Best Country Song ("Woman Up").

== Sources ==
1. The Coatesville Record Monday September 18, 1988 Front Page - Local Talent Gets Opportunity to Show Off Wares at Gazebo, Deborah Yonick
2. Philadelphia Inquirer Sunday March 14, 1993 pg 200 - Heads Above The Crowd, Inga Sandvoss
3. Playbill.com
4. New York Times Theater Review - To Kill A Mockingbird
5. The Daily Record Sunday March 21, 1993 - Coatesville Youth Has Eye On Stardom, Lisa Anderson
