= Wonder Why (song) =

"Wonder Why" is a song written by Nicholas Brodszky (music) and Sammy Cahn (lyrics), published in 1951.

Brodszky and Cahn wrote "Wonder Why" for the film Rich, Young and Pretty (1951, directed by Norman Taurog). In the film, the song is sung by Vic Damone, Jane Powell and The Four Freshmen. The song was nominated for an Oscar in 1952 in the category Best Song.

The first few lines of the song are as follows:

Wonder why I'm not myself of late
I'm feeling strangely great, I wonder why
I suppose some genius could explain
Why I walk in the rain, just let him try.

Vic Damone's recording of the song was issued by Mercury Records and reached number 21 on the US charts in September 1951. "Wonder Why" was covered in the 1950s by numerous musicians, including Billy Eckstine, Tex Beneke, Milt Jackson, Maynard Ferguson, the Dizzy Gillespie Big Band, Tyree Glenn, Sam Donahue, Tal Farlow, Kay Armen, Melba Liston, Shelly Manne and Red Garland in the U.S., and Sonya Hedenbratt in Sweden. Tom Lord lists 85 cover versions of the song. In later years, "Wonder Why" was recorded by Alan Broadbent, Cedar Walton and Bill Evans (The Secret Sessions). Michael Feinstein recorded the song on his 1989 CD, The M.G.M. Album. Carmen McRae recorded it in 1991 on her last recording, Sarah: Dedicated to You. Denver pianist Ellyn Rucker recorded it in 1991 for her 1992 album Live in New Orleans
