= Darby O'Gill =

Irish fictional character

Darby O'Gill is a fictional Irishman who appears in the writings of Irish author Herminie Templeton Kavanagh, including her books Darby O'Gill and the Good People (1903) and Ashes of Old Wishes and Other Darby O'Gill Tales (1926).

== Film ==
In 1959, the Walt Disney Company adapted Kavanaugh's works to the silver screen under the title Darby O'Gill and the Little People. In the film, O'Gill is an aging groundskeeper who engages in a friendly battle of wits with a leprechaun king, and is played by the actor Albert Sharpe.

One of the VeggieTales videos, The Wonderful Wizard Of Ha's, has a protagonist whose name is Darby O'Gill (played by Junior Asparagus), but the story itself is mainly a retelling of The Wizard of Oz.

== Music ==
At least two American Irish-music bands have taken O'Gill's name under which to perform. Darby O'Gill operates in Portland, Oregon, while Darby O'Gill and the Little People center their performances in Las Vegas. Apart from the use of the name, the two bands have no connection.
