= Michael Feinstein Sings the Burton Lane Songbook, Vol. 2 =

Studio album by Michael Feinstein
- Released: 1992
- Recorded: 1992
- Genre: Traditional pop, vocal jazz
- Length: 65:42
- Label: Elektra

Michael Feinstein chronology
Michael Feinstein Sings the Jule Styne Songbook (1991)	Michael Feinstein Sings the Burton Lane Songbook, Vol. 2 (1992)	Pure Imagination (1992)

Michael Feinstein Sings the Burton Lane Songbook, Vol. 2 is a 1992 album by American performer Michael Feinstein, of songs composed by Burton Lane. A companion volume, Michael Feinstein Sings the Burton Lane Songbook, Vol. 1 was released in 1990.

Feinstein is accompanied on piano by Lane throughout the album.

== Reception ==
Professional ratings
Review scores
Source	Rating
Allmusic	4/5 stars

The Allmusic review by William Ruhlmann awarded the album four stars and said of the album that "Since Lane is unaccountably less renowned than he should be, this collection and its predecessor perform an especially valuable function".

== Track listing ==
1. "It's Time for a Love Song" (Alan Jay Lerner) – 3:06
2. "The World Is in My Arms" (E.Y. "Yip" Harburg) – 3:46
3. "I Want a New Romance" (Sam Coslow) – 2:39
4. "Everything I Have Is Yours"/"Your Head on My Shoulder" (Harold Adamson) – 4:17
5. "Poor You" (Harburg) – 3:08
6. "Open Your Eyes" (Lerner) – 3:01
7. "I Hear Music" (Frank Loesser) – 2:10
8. "The Happiest Day of My Life" (Lerner) – 3:46
9. "The Lady's in Love with You" (Loesser) – 3:43
10. "Where Have I Seen Your Face Before?" (Harburg) – 3:30
11. "Don't Let It Get You Down" (Harburg) – 3:50
12. "It Happens Every Time" (Ira Gershwin) – 2:46
13. "Look Who's Here" (Adamson) – 2:12
14. "Hurry, It's Lovely Up Here" (Lerner) – 2:48
15. "On the S.S. Bernard Cohn" (Lerner) – 1:29
16. "Melinda" (Lerner) – 3:50
17. "Dancing Lesson" (Lerner) – 1:00
18. "She Wasn't You" (Lerner) – 3:14
19. "Tosy and Cosh" (Lerner) – 1:10
20. "Wait Til We're Sixty-Five" (Lerner) – 2:10
21. "What Did I Have" (Lerner) – 3:02
22. "Come Back to Me" (Lerner) – 2:30
23. "On a Clear Day (You Can See Forever)" (Lerner) – 2:35

All music composed by Burton Lane, lyricists indicated.

== Personnel ==
- Michael Feinstein – vocals, liner notes, producer
- Burton Lane – piano, liner notes
- John Costa – art direction, design
- Eric Cowden – assistant engineer
