= The Sinatra Project =

Studio album by Michael Feinstein
- Released: 2008
- Recorded: 2008
- Genre: Vocal jazz
- Length: 50:15
- Label: Concord
- Producer: John Burk

Michael Feinstein chronology
Michael Feinstein Sings the Jule Styne Songbook (2008)	The Sinatra Project (2008)

Professional ratings
Review scores
Source	Rating
Allmusic	4/5 stars

The Sinatra Project is a 2008 studio album by the American singer Michael Feinstein, recorded in tribute to the singer Frank Sinatra (1915–1998).

== Track listing ==
No.	Title	Writer(s)	Length
1.	"Exactly Like You"	Dorothy Fields, Jimmy McHugh	2:51
2.	"There's a Small Hotel"	Lorenz Hart, Richard Rodgers	3:48
3.	"Fools Rush In"	Rube Bloom, Johnny Mercer	4:04
4.	"The Song Is You"	Oscar Hammerstein, Jerome Kern	2:59
5.	"The Same Hello, The Same Goodbye"	Alan Bergman, Marilyn Bergman, John Williams	4:18
6.	"Begin the Beguine"	Cole Porter	5:03
7.	"I've Got a Crush on You"	George Gershwin, Ira Gershwin	3:18
8.	"It's All Right with Me"	Porter	3:31
9.	"You Go to My Head"	J. Fred Coots, Haven Gillespie	4:06
10.	"How Long Will It Last" (with China Forbes)	Max Lief, Joseph Meyer	4:06
11.	"All My Tomorrows"/"All the Way"	Sammy Cahn, Jimmy Van Heusen	5:07
12.	"At Long Last Love"	Porter, Marshall Barer	3:32

== Personnel ==
=== Performance ===
- Michael Feinstein - vocal

=== Production ===
- John Burk - executive producer
