= Darby O'Gill and the Little People =

1959 film by Robert Stevenson

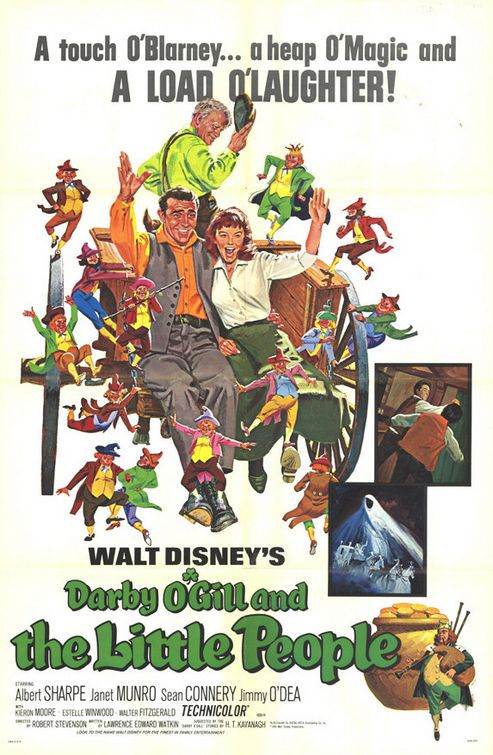
- Film poster by Reynold Brown
- Directed by: Robert Stevenson
- Written by: Lawrence Edward Watkin
- Based on: Darby O'Gill by H. T. Kavanagh
- Produced by: Bill Anderson; Walt Disney
- Starring: Albert Sharpe; Janet Munro; Sean Connery; Jimmy O'Dea; Kieron Moore; Estelle Winwood; Walter Fitzgerald
- Cinematography: Winton Hoch
- Edited by: Stanley E. Johnson
- Music by: Oliver Wallace
- Production company: Walt Disney Productions
- Distributed by: Buena Vista Distribution
- Release dates: June 24, 1959 (Dublin); June 26, 1959 (Los Angeles)
- Running time: 93 minutes
- Country: United States
- Language: English
- Box office: Original release: $2.6 million (est. US/ Canada rentals); 1969 re-release: $2.3 million (US/ Canada rentals)

Darby O'Gill and the Little People is a 1959 American fantasy adventure film produced by Walt Disney Productions, adapted from the Darby O'Gill stories of Herminie Templeton Kavanagh. Directed by Robert Stevenson and written by Lawrence Edward Watkin, the film stars Albert Sharpe as O'Gill alongside Janet Munro, Sean Connery, and Jimmy O'Dea.

== Plot ==
Darby O'Gill and his daughter, Katie, live in Rathcullen, a small Irish town, where Darby is the caretaker for Lord Fitzpatrick's estate. Darby continually tries to catch a tribe of leprechauns, particularly their king, Brian Connors.

Lord Fitzpatrick retires Darby, replacing him with a young Dubliner named Michael McBride. Darby begs Michael not to tell Katie he has been replaced, and he reluctantly agrees. While chasing a púca disguised as Fitzpatrick's horse Cleopatra, Darby is captured by the leprechauns and taken to their mountain lair, Knocknasheega. Brian has brought Darby there to live with him, as he has come to respect and care for Darby, even as an adversary. He must also prevent Katie from learning that he lost his job and that Darby cannot leave Knocknasheega.

Darby tricks the leprechauns into opening the mountain and leaving by playing "The Fox Chase" on Brian's Stradivarius violin. Darby escapes, and expecting Brian to pursue him, later engages him in a drinking game with a jug of poitín, allowing him to capture the leprechaun at sunrise when his magic has no effect. Since Darby has caught him, Brian grants him three wishes. Brian tries to trick Darby into making additional wishes, but Darby recalls that wishing for a fourth forfeits them all from their previous encounter. Darby's first wish is for Brian to stay by his side for two weeks or until Darby runs out of wishes. Darby tries to show Michael the King while he is trapped in a sack, but Michael sees only a rabbit; Darby accidentally wishes that Michael could see Brian, which the fairy king grants with the caveat, "He does see me, he sees me as a rabbit."

Pony Sugrue, the town bully, decides to try to take Michael's new job and Katie for himself. Pony's mother, Sheelah, tells Katie about Darby's retirement, causing Katie to confront Darby and Michael angrily. When Cleopatra gets loose again, Katie chases her to Knocknasheega. Darby later finds Katie fallen at the bottom of a cliff and stricken with a deadly fever. A banshee appears and summons the Dullahan on a death coach to transport Katie's soul. Brian sadly grants Darby's third wish to take Katie's place. Inside the death coach, Brian consoles Darby, then, to save him, tricks him into wishing he would have Brian's company in the afterlife. This counts as a fourth wish, and Brian voids all his others. Darby is freed from the death coach and returns to Katie, who makes a full recovery. Michael later confronts and humiliates Pony at the pub. Michael and Katie fall in love with Darby's approval.

== Cast ==
- Albert Sharpe as Darby O'Gill
- Janet Munro as Katie O'Gill
- Sean Connery as Michael McBride
- Jimmy O'Dea as King Brian
- Kieron Moore as Pony Sugrue
- Estelle Winwood as Widow Sheelah Sugrue
- Walter Fitzgerald as Lord Fitzpatrick
- Denis O'Dea as Father Murphy
- J. G. Devlin as Tom Kerrigan
- Jack MacGowran as Phadrig Oge (King Brian's adjutant)
- Farrell Pelly as Paddy Scanlon
- Nora O'Mahoney as Molly Malloy
- Joanne Genthon as the Banshee

== Production ==
Walt Disney conceived the film during a trip to Ireland with the Irish Folklore Commission in 1947. The following year, Disney announced he would make a film titled Three Wishes, based on a script from Watkin about an Irishman battling a leprechaun, which was to involve both live action and animation, but the script was never produced. Disney took a second trip to Ireland in 1956 and announced a new film that October, The Three Wishes of Darby O'Gill, based on Kavanagh's 1903 book Darby O'Gill and the Good People, retaining Watkin as writer. Disney studied Gaelic folklore for three months at the Dublin Library and received input from seanchaithe (traditional storytellers) while developing the film. During casting in London in February 1958, the film's title became Darby O'Gill and the Little People.

Barry Fitzgerald was Disney's first choice to play both Darby and Brian. Sharpe and O'Dea were instead cast in the lead roles after Disney spotted O'Dea in a pantomime. Munro was cast in March after Disney signed her for a five-year contract, while Connery was borrowed from 20th Century Fox, where he was then under contract. Darby O'Gill and the Little People was Connery's first leading role. Filming started on the Disney backlot in May 1958, though some location work was done at Albertson Ranch in the San Fernando Valley.

Disney's Stage 4 was purpose-built for the production of Darby O’Gill, housing some of the largest sets ever constructed, their scale necessitated by numerous and elaborate forced perspective setups. A total of 649 lights were needed to illuminate the football field-sized stage. When those lights were switched on for the first time, their combined power surge temporarily knocked out electricity to the city of Burbank.

Munro and Connery sing a duet in the film titled "Pretty Irish Girl", apparently dubbing over vocals by Brendan O'Dowda and Ruby Murray, which was released in the UK as a single in 1959. A demonstration recording of Connery singing the song solo was included in the 1992 compilation The Music of Disney: A Legacy of Song.

Dell Comics released a comic book adaptation of the film in August 1959.

Walt Disney Home Video released the film for VHS in October 1981 as its first home media release.

== Reception ==
Writing for The New York Times, A. H. Weiler praised the cast, but described Connery as "merely tall, dark and handsome", and called the film an "overpoweringly charming concoction of standard Gaelic tall stories, fantasy and romance". Variety called the film a "rollicking Gaelic fantasy" with "meticulously painstaking production" and "a gem" of a performance from Sharpe, though Connery was called "artificial" and "the weakest link in Robert Stevenson's otherwise distinguished direction". Charles Stinson of the Los Angeles Times wrote: "Being a Disney product, it is as technically perfect a job as can be had; the Technicolor, the camera work, the special effects, the Irish music, and all are a rich feast for anyone's eye and ear." Monthly Film Bulletin called the special effects "brilliantly executed", but found that "all attempts at Irish charm seem pretty synthetic, a notable exception being the playing of Jimmy O'Dea, who makes King Brian the most likeable and beguiling leprechaun yet to appear on the screen."

Leonard Maltin praises the film in his book The Disney Films, calling it "not only one of Disney's best films, but [also it] is certainly one of the best fantasies ever put on film." In a later article, he included it among a list of outstanding lesser-known Disney films. Filmink called it "one of Disney's most enchanting live-action films of the 1950s, if not the most, and a great deal of that is due to the bewitching Munro."

The film has a 100% rating on Rotten Tomatoes based on 15 reviews, with an average grade of 7 out of 10.

Munro won the 1960 Golden Globe for New Star of the Year for her performance in the film.

=== Box office ===
According to Kinematograph Weekly the film performed "better than average" at the British box office in 1959.

== See also ==
- Irish mythology
- List of films featuring miniature people
