= The Return of October =

1948 film by Joseph H. Lewis

- Directed by: Joseph H. Lewis
- Screenplay by: Melvin Frank; Norman Panama
- Story by: Karen DeWolf; Connie Lee
- Produced by: Rudolph Maté
- Starring: Glenn Ford; Terry Moore; Albert Sharpe; James Gleason
- Cinematography: William Snyder
- Edited by: Gene Havlick
- Music by: George Duning
- Production company: Columbia Pictures
- Distributed by: Columbia Pictures
- Release dates: October 26, 1948 (New York City); December 21, 1948 (United States)
- Running time: 89 minutes
- Country: United States
- Language: English
- Budget: $1 million

The Return of October is a 1948 American sports comedy film directed by Joseph H. Lewis and starring Glenn Ford, Terry Moore and James Gleason. It was produced and distributed by Columbia Pictures.

== Plot ==
Terry is a teenage girl whose Uncle Willie, a horse trainer, dreams of winning the Derby. He bets everything on his horse Sunset, then collapses and dies after it loses.

Now living with wealthy Aunt Martha, the girl is convinced that Uncle Willie has been reincarnated as a horse named October. A psychology professor, Bentley Bassett, writes a book about Terry, which is used in a sanity hearing against her by crooked relatives who want dying Aunt Martha's money.

Bassett uses college funds to help Terry buy the horse. They enter October in the Derby, where other bettors join them in cheering "Uncle Willie" to victory.

== Cast ==
Actor	Role
Glenn Ford	Prof. Bassett Jr.
Albert Sharpe	Vince
Terry Moore	Terry
James Gleason	Uncle Willie
Dame May Whitty	Martha
Samuel S. Hinds	Judge
Lloyd Corrigan	Mr.Dutton Attorney
Henry O'Neill	Hotchkiss
Ray Walker	Joe

== See also ==
- List of films about horses
- List of films about horse racing

== Bibliography ==
- Aaker, Everett. Television Western Players, 1960-1975: A Biographical Dictionary. McFarland, 2017.
