= The M.G.M. Album =

The MGM Album

Studio album by Michael Feinstein
- Released: 1989
- Recorded: June 18–August 15, 1989
- Genre: Vocal jazz
- Length: 52:03
- Label: Elektra
- Producers: Ian Bernard, Michael Feinstein

Michael Feinstein chronology
Isn't It Romantic (1989)	The MGM Album (1989)	Michael Feinstein Sings the Burton Lane Songbook, Vol. 1 (1990)

The MGM Album is a 1989 album by American vocalist Michael Feinstein of songs from Metro-Goldwyn-Mayer films. The album is arranged by Ian Bernard and Larry Wilcox.

== Reception ==
Professional ratings
Review scores
Source	Rating
Allmusic	3/5 stars

The Allmusic review by William Ruhlmann awarded the album three stars and said of Feinstein, "As usual, Feinstein sings in his earnest tenor, which has gained range and expression as an instrument over his recording career, and he savors the words with a scholar's affection. He serves the material, sometimes reverently, although it is still true that the least impressive thing about a Michael Feinstein album tends to be Michael Feinstein himself".

== Track listing ==
1. "MGM Fanfare" (Franz Waxman) - 0:16
2. "That's Entertainment!" (Howard Dietz, Arthur Schwartz) - 2:04
3. "It's a Most Unusual Day" (Harold Adamson, Jimmy McHugh) - 3:52
4. "Time After Time" (Sammy Cahn, Jule Styne) - 4:37
5. "Spring, Spring, Spring" (Gene de Paul, Johnny Mercer) - 3:34
6. "Friendly Star"/"This Heart of Mine" (Mack Gordon, Harry Warren)/(Warren, Freed) - 6:00
7. "Our Love Affair" (Roger Edens, Arthur Freed) - 4:06
8. "Please Don't Say No, Say Maybe" (Sammy Fain, Freed) - 3:26
9. "Wonder Why" (Nicholas Brodszky, Cahn) - 3:44
10. "All I Do Is Dream of You"/"You Are My Lucky Star" (Nacio Herb Brown, Freed)/(Freed, Brown) - 5:26
11. "If I Only Had a Brain" (Harold Arlen, Yip Harburg) - 6:33
12. "You and I" (Leslie Bricusse) - 3:31
13. "Singin' in the Rain" (Brown, Freed) - 3:08
14. "That's Entertainment! (Reprise)" - 1:46

== Personnel ==
Performance

- Michael Feinstein - vocals, liner notes
- Jerry Herman - piano
- Larry Wilcox - arranger
- Ian Bernard - arranger, conductor, producer
- Chuck Berghofer - double bass, bass guitar
- Larry Corbett - cello
- Dennis Karmazyn
- Ray Kelley
- Ron Leonard
- Gerald Vinci - concertmaster, violin
- John Guerin - drums
- David Duke - French horn
- Bill Lane
- Joe Meyer
- Brian O'Connor
- Tim May - guitar
- Gayle Levant - harp
- Larry Bunker - percussion
- Gary Coleman
- Alan Broadbent - piano
- Pete Jolly
- Herbie Harper - trombone
- Donald Waldrop
- Chauncey Welsch
- Bob Findley - trumpet
- Chuck Findley
- Donald Smith
- Marilyn Baker - viola
- Samuel Boghossian
- Ken Burwood-Hoy
- Alan de Yeritch
- Pamela Goldsmith
- Peter Hatch
- Margot MacLaine
- Arnold Belnick - violin
- Harry Cykman
- Isabelle Daskoff
- Assa Drori
- Bruce Dukov
- Henry Ferber
- Peter Kent
- Brian Leonard
- Gordon Marron
- Don Palmer
- Debra Price
- Haim Shtrum
- Marshall Sosson
- Robert Sushel
- Mari Tsumura-Botnick
- Shari Zippert
- Bob Cooper - woodwind
- Robert Cooper
- Ronnie Lang
- John Lowe
- Bob Shepherd
- Phil Sobel
- Sheridon Stokes

Production

- Jon Gardey - photography
- Roddy McDowall
- Teddy Antolin - hair stylist, makeup
- Carol Bobolts - art direction
- Dennis Ziemienski - artwork, illustrations
- Rick Winquest - assistant engineer
- Jules Chaikin - contractor
- Hank Cicalo - engineer
- Gary Klein - executive producer
- Charles Koppelman
- Suzie Katayama - music preparation
