= Michael Feinstein Sings the Jerry Herman Songbook =

Studio album by Michael Feinstein
- Released: October 26, 1993
- Recorded: 1993
- Genre: Vocal jazz
- Length: 58:23
- Label: Elektra

Michael Feinstein chronology
Pure Imagination (1992)	Michael Feinstein Sings the Jerry Herman Songbook (1993)	Forever (1993)

Michael Feinstein Sings the Jerry Herman Songbook is a 1993 album by American vocalist Michael Feinstein of songs written by Jerry Herman.

== Reception ==
Professional ratings
Review scores
Source	Rating
Allmusic	4/5 stars

The Allmusic review by William Ruhlmann awarded the album four stars and said the album is "a recital-like quality. It also has a cabaret-like quality...he demonstrates that Herman has had an amazing facility for writing catchy uptempo material and heart-rending ballads, no matter what show they happened to have been intended for".

== Track listing ==
1. "Just Go to the Movies" - 3:32
2. "As Simple as That" - 3:11
3. Hello, Dolly! Medley
  - "Put on Your Sunday Clothes" - 1:09
  - "It Only Takes a Moment" - 1:34
  - "Before the Parade Passes By" - 2:01
4. "Penny in My Pocket" - 3:22
5. "Kiss Her Now" - 3:02
6. "With You on My Arm" - 2:18
7. "Marianne" - 3:01
8. "Mame" - 3:51
9. "Dancing" - 2:28
10. "Let's Not Waste a Moment" - 4:13
11. "Loving You" - 3:17
12. "Look Over There" - 2:25
13. "To Be Alone with You" - 3:49
14. Mame Medley
  - "It's Today" - 1:01
  - "If She Walked into My Life" - 3:15
  - "We Need a Little Christmas" - 1:09
  - "It's Today (Reprise)" - 0:35
15. "I Won't Send Roses" - 3:05
16. "Hello, Dolly!" - 3:20
17. "You I Like" - 2:45

All songs written by Jerry Herman.

== Personnel ==
- Michael Feinstein - vocals, piano
- Jerry Herman - piano
