= You're All the World to Me =

Song
- Released: 1950
- Composer: Burton Lane
- Lyricist: Alan Jay Lerner

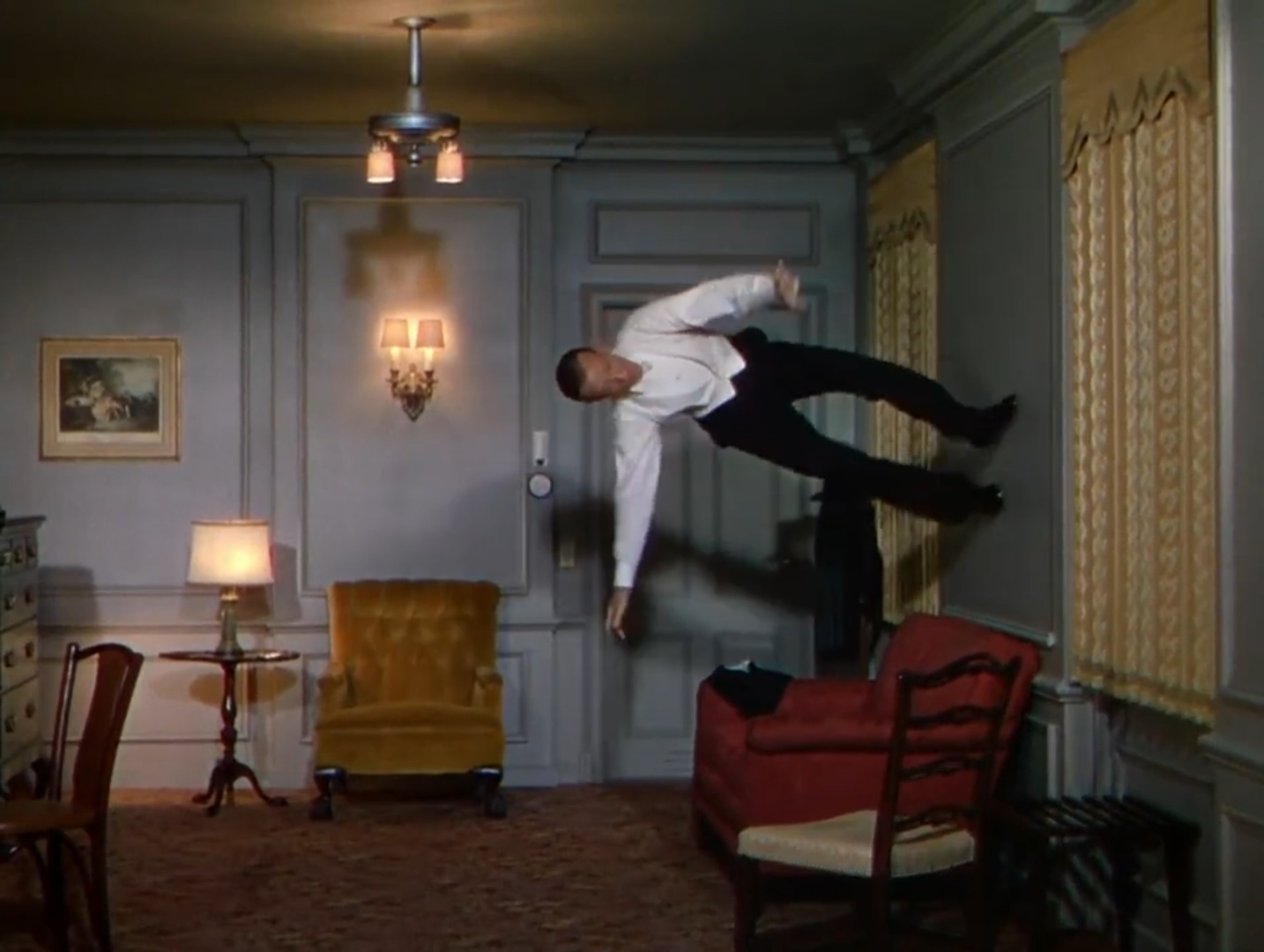
Fred Astaire dancing on the walls and ceiling in "You're All the World to Me"

"You're All the World to Me" is an American song written in 1950 by composer Burton Lane and lyricist Alan Jay Lerner for the 1951 MGM musical Royal Wedding.

Lane wrote the music seventeen years earlier for the song "My Minstrel Man" (with lyrics by Harold Adamson), introduced by Harold Nicholas in the 1934 Eddie Cantor musical comedy Kid Millions. The lyrics by Lerner, who also wrote the story and screenplay, give song-and-dance man Tom Bowen, played by Fred Astaire, the opportunity to proclaim his love for Anne Ashmond (Sarah Churchill) while dancing on the walls and ceiling of a custom-made set which, along with an attached camera and camera operator, rolled on an axis to provide the anti-gravity illusion.

The music to the song was used again in 1953 for the title credits and dance routine that opened MGM's Torch Song, which starred Joan Crawford.

== Other appearances ==
The song was featured in the episode "Girls (and Boys) On Film" in the fourth season of the American TV series Glee. Will Schuester (Matthew Morrison) danced on the walls and ceiling to woo Emma Pillsbury (Jayma Mays).
