= Moments Like This (Frank Loesser and Burton Lane song) =

"Moments Like This" is a popular song with music by Burton Lane and lyrics by Frank Loesser, published in 1938. It was written for the 1938 film College Swing, in which it was performed by Florence George. It was also used in the 1941 film Las Vegas Nights.

== Notable recordings ==
- 1938 Maxine Sullivan - on Victor catalog no. 25802
- 1953 Dean Martin - in the film Money from Home
- 1956 Julie London - on the album Lonely Girl
- 1958 Dinah Shore - on the album Moments Like These
- 1960 Peggy Lee - on the album Pretty Eyes
- 1961 Peggy Lee - on the album Basin Street East Proudly Presents Miss Peggy Lee (1961)
- 1962 Johnny Mathis - on the album Rapture
- 1990 Michael Feinstein - on the album Michael Feinstein Sings the Burton Lane Songbook, Vol. 1
