= Michael Feinstein Sings the Burton Lane Songbook, Vol. 1 =

Studio album by Michael Feinstein
- Released: November 1990
- Recorded: 1990
- Genre: Vocal jazz
- Length: 56:34
- Label: Elektra

Michael Feinstein chronology
Over There (1990)	Michael Feinstein Sings the Burton Lane Songbook, Vol. 1 (1990)	Michael Feinstein Sings the Jule Styne Songbook (1991)

Michael Feinstein Sings the Burton Lane Songbook, Vol. 1 is a 1990 album by American vocalist Michael Feinstein, of songs composed by Burton Lane. A second volume, Michael Feinstein Sings the Burton Lane Songbook, Vol. 2 was released in 1992.

Feinstein was accompanied on piano by Lane. They duetted on the song "Applause, Applause". Two compositions by Lane had their debut recording here, "I Can Hardly Wait" and "And Suddenly It's Christmas".

== Reception ==
Professional ratings
Review scores
Source	Rating
Allmusic	3/5 stars

The Allmusic review by William Ruhlmann awarded the album three stars and said of the album that "Since Lane never attracted the kind of anthologies devoted to the work of his peers, this album is especially valuable".

== Track listing ==
1. "Applause, Applause!" (Ira Gershwin) – 1:59
2. "Dancing on a Dime" (Frank Loesser) – 3:56
3. Songs from Babes on Broadway:
  - "Babes on Broadway" (Ralph Freed) – 1:20
  - "Anything Can Happen in New York" (and playoff music) (E.Y. "Yip" Harburg) – 3:35
  - "How About You?" (Freed) – 3:11
  - "Babes on Broadway (Reprise)" (Freed) – 1:03
4. "I Can Hardly Wait" (Alan Bergman, Marilyn Bergman) – 2:44
5. "How Could You Believe Me When I Said I Love You" (Alan Jay Lerner) – 2:29
6. "And Suddenly It's Christmas" (Ervin Drake) – 2:47
7. "Too Late Now" (Lerner) – 3:25
8. "You're All the World to Me" (Lerner) – 2:39
9. "Moments Like This" (Loesser) – 3:22
10. "How'dja Like to Love Me?" (Loesser) – 2:40
11. "One More Walk Around the Garden" (Lerner) – 3:14
12. "In Our United State" (Gershwin) – 3:29
13. Songs from Finian's Rainbow:
  - "How Are Things in Glocca Morra?" (Harburg) – 2:45
  - "Old Devil Moon" (Harburg) – 3:14
  - "When I'm Not Near the Girl I Love" (Harburg) – 3:04
  - "Look to the Rainbow" (Harburg) – 3:27
  - "If This Isn't Love" (Harburg) – 2:11

All songs composed by Burton Lane, lyricists indicated.

== Personnel ==
- Michael Feinstein – vocals, liner notes, producer
- Burton Lane – piano, vocals, liner notes
- John Costa – art direction, design
- Alexander Isley – cover design
- Robert Cubbage – engineer
