= College Swing =

1938 film by Raoul Walsh

- theatrical poster
- Directed by: Raoul Walsh
- Written by: Frederick Hazlitt Brennan (adaptation); Walter DeLeon; Francis Martin; Preston Sturges (uncredited)
- Produced by: Lewis E. Gensler
- Starring: George Burns; Gracie Allen; Martha Raye; Bob Hope; Betty Grable
- Cinematography: Victor Milner
- Edited by: LeRoy Stone
- Music by: Lyrics: Frank Loesser; Music: Burton Lane; Hoagy Carmichael; Manning Sherwin; Incidental: Gordon Jenkins; John Leipold; Victor Young
- Distributed by: Paramount Pictures
- Release dates: April 13, 1938 (New York City); April 29, 1938 (United States)
- Running time: 86 minutes
- Country: United States
- Language: English

College Swing, also known as Swing, Teacher, Swing in the U.K., is a 1938 American comedy film directed by Raoul Walsh and starring George Burns, Gracie Allen, Martha Raye, and Bob Hope. The supporting cast features Edward Everett Horton, Ben Blue, Betty Grable, Jackie Coogan, John Payne, Robert Cummings, and Jerry Colonna.

== Plot ==
It's 1738, and Gracie Alden of the powerful Alden family fails to graduate from the college founded by her grandfather for the ninth year in a row, so he leaves the institution in his will to the first female of the family to graduate within 200 years. At the deadline, in 1938, another Gracie Alden, the last girl of the line, is having trouble with her studies, so she hires fast-talking Bud Brady to help her. Her efforts are opposed by woman-hating professor Hubert Dash and his secretary George Jones, who don't want to see their beloved college fall into the hands of an empty-headed nit-wit like Gracie.

When by hook and by crook Gracie manages to pass her exam and becomes the owner of the college, she does away with entrance exams, hires a bunch of incompetent but kooky teachers, and turns the place into a jumpin' jitterbugging joint complete with swing bands and remote radio broadcasts.

== Cast ==
- George Burns as George Jonas
- Gracie Allen as Gracie Alden
- Martha Raye as Mable
- Bob Hope as Bud Brady
- Edward Everett Horton as Hubert Dash
- Florence George as Ginna Ashburn
- Ben Blue as Ben Volt
- Betty Grable as Betty
- Jackie Coogan as Jackie
- John Payne as Martin Bates
- Cecil Cunningham as Dean Sleet
- Robert Cummings as Radio Announcer
- Skinnay Ennis as Skinnay
- Jerry Colonna as Prof. Yascha Koloski (uncredited)
- The Slate Brothers as themselves
- Robert Mitchell and St. Brendan's Choristers as themselves

Cast notes:

- Mary Livingstone, who became well known as the wife of Jack Benny, appears in a small uncredited part as an usherette.
- Jackie Coogan and Betty Grable were married at the time they made this film together.

== Production credits ==
- Raoul Walsh - director
- Lewis E. Gensler - producer
- Walter DeLeon - screenplay
- Francis Martin - screenplay
- Frederick Hazlitt Brennan - adaptation
- Ted Lesser - idea
- Victor Milner - photography
- Hans Dreier - art direction
- Ernst Fegté - art direction
- LeRoy Stone - editor
- Harold Lewis - sound recording
- Howard Wilson - sound recording
- Edith Head - costumes
- A. E. Freudeman - interior decorations
- LeRoy Prinz - staging dances
- Boris Morros - musical direction
- Arthur Franklin - musical adviser

== Songs ==
- "The Old School Bell" - sung by Robert Mitchell and St. Brendan's Choristers
- "Moments Like This" - by Burton Lane (music) and Frank Loesser (words), performed by Florence George
- "I Fall in Love with You Every Day" - by Manning Sherwin (music) and Frank Loesser (words), performed by Florence George and John Payne
- "College Swing" - by Hoagy Carmichael (music) and Frank Loesser (words), sung by Betty Grable and Skinnay Ennis, danced by Betty Grable and Jackie Coogan
- "How'ja Like to Love Me?" - by Burton Lane (music) and Frank Loesser (words), performed by Martha Raye and Bob Hope
- "What Did Romeo Say To Juliet?" - by Burton Lane (music) and Frank Loesser (words), performed by John Payne and Florence George
- "What a Rumba Does to Romance" - by Manning Sherwin (music) and Frank Loesser (lyrics), performed by Martha Raye with Ben Blue, danced by Betty Grable and Jackie Coogan, George Burns and Gracie Allen, The Slate Brothers, and unidentified extras
- "You're a Natural" - by Manning Sherwin (music) and Frank Loesser (lyrics), performed by Gracie Allen
- "Irish Washerwoman" - traditional Irish jig, danced by Gracie Allen
- "Please" - performed by Jerry Colonna.
