= Albert Sharpe =

Irish actor (1885–1970)

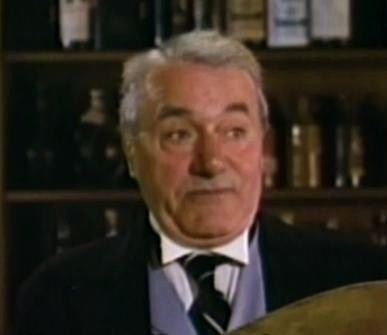
- in Royal Wedding (1951)
- Born: 15 April 1885; Belfast, Northern Ireland
- Died: 13 February 1970 (aged 84); Belfast, Northern Ireland
- Occupation: Actor
- Years active: 1905−1960

Albert Sharpe (15 April 1885 – 13 February 1970) was an Irish stage and film actor.

== Life and work ==
Albert Edward Sharpe was born at 8 Goudy's Court in Belfast on 15 April 1885, one of six children born to fishmonger John Sharpe, an Anglican Protestant, and Mary Collins, a Roman Catholic. He attended St. Mary's Christian Brothers Grammar School.

In December 1918 he married Margaret "Madge" Waterson and they had six children, three sons and three daughters.

His most famous roles were those of Darby O'Gill in Disney's Darby O'Gill and the Little People featuring Sean Connery, and as Finian McLonergan in the Original Broadway production of the musical Finian's Rainbow. (The film version, made in 1968, stars Fred Astaire in the role.)

On screen he played Fiona's father Andrew in the MGM musical Brigadoon. He was in The Day They Robbed the Bank of England (1960) with Peter O'Toole. Portrait of Jennie was filming in New York at the time when Sharpe, David Wayne and Maude Simmons all appeared in Finian’s Rainbow, and all three were recruited by producer David O. Selznick to perform simultaneously in Portrait of Jennie.

He was also a member of the Abbey Players.

He died in 1970 in Belfast, 59 days short of his 85th birthday.

== Personal life ==
Sharpe's son, Terry, died in Spain on 29 April 2026, aged 104. Terry's son, also named Terry, was a member of Northern Irish pop band The Adventures.

== Filmography ==
Year	Title	Role	Notes
1946	I See a Dark Stranger	Irish Publican	aka "The Adventuress" (USA). Uncredited
1947	Odd Man Out	Bus Conductor	Uncredited
1948	Up in Central Park	Timothy Moore	
1948	The Return of October	Vince the Tout	aka "A Date with Destiny" (UK)
1948	Portrait of Jennie	Moore	aka "Jennie" (UK) OR "Tidal Wave"
1949	Adventure in Baltimore	Dan Fletcher	aka "Bachelor Bait" (UK)
1951	Royal Wedding	James Ashmond	aka "Wedding Bells" (UK)
1951	The Highwayman	Forsythe	
1951	You Never Can Tell	Grandpa Hathaway	aka "One Never Knows" OR "You Never Know" (UK)
1952	Face to Face	First Mate Brown	('The Secret Sharer')
1954	Brigadoon	Andrew Campbell	
1959	Darby O'Gill and the Little People	Darby O'Gill	(with pre-James Bond era Sean Connery)
1960	The Day They Robbed the Bank of England	Tosher	(final film role)
