= Royal Wedding =

1951 MGM musical comedy film directed by Stanley Donen

- Theatrical poster
- Directed by: Stanley Donen
- Written by: Alan Jay Lerner
- Produced by: Arthur Freed
- Starring: Fred Astaire; Jane Powell; Peter Lawford; Sarah Churchill; Keenan Wynn; Albert Sharpe
- Cinematography: Robert Planck
- Edited by: Albert Akst
- Music by: Burton Lane (music); Alan Jay Lerner (lyrics)
- Production company: Metro-Goldwyn-Mayer
- Distributed by: Loew's, Inc.
- Release dates: March 8, 1951 (New York); March 20, 1951 (Los Angeles)
- Running time: 93 minutes
- Country: United States
- Language: English
- Budget: $1.7 million
- Box office: $3.9 million

Royal Wedding is a 1951 American musical comedy film directed by Stanley Donen and starring Fred Astaire and Jane Powell, with music by Burton Lane and lyrics by Alan Jay Lerner. Set in 1947 London at the time of the wedding of Princess Elizabeth and Philip Mountbatten, the film follows an American brother-sister song-and-dance duo, each of whom falls in love—the brother with a female dancer and the sister with an impoverished but well-connected nobleman. The film marked Donen's second directorial feature. It was released as Wedding Bells in the United Kingdom.

Royal Wedding is one of several MGM musicals that entered the public domain because the studio failed to renew the copyright registration in the 28th year after its publication.

== Plot ==
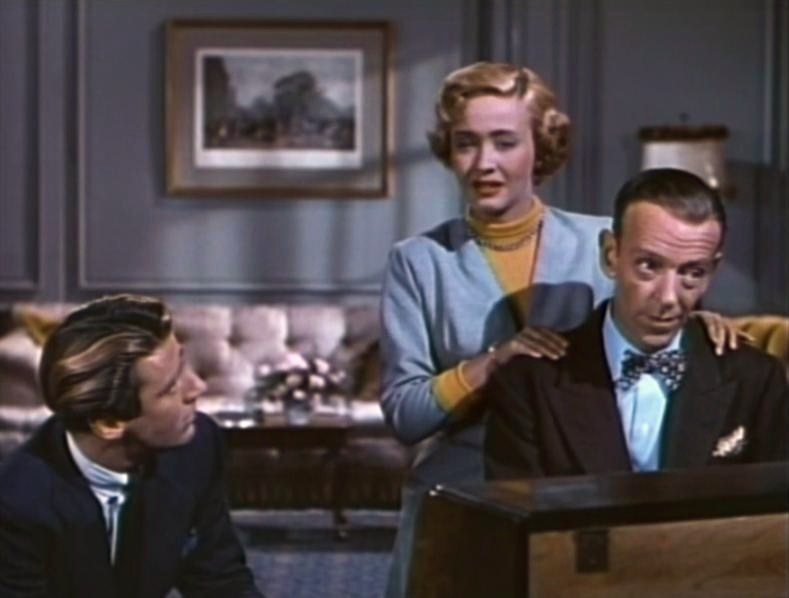
Peter Lawford, Jane Powell and Fred Astaire in Royal Wedding

Brother and sister Tom and Ellen Bowen star in the hit Broadway show Every Night at Seven. They are persuaded to take the show to London, capitalizing on the imminent royal wedding of Princess Elizabeth and Philip Mountbatten. On the ship, Ellen meets and quickly falls in love with the impoverished but well-connected lord John Brindale. While casting the show in London, Tom falls in love with dancer Anne Ashmond and helps her reconcile her estranged parents. He asks his agent to locate Anne's supposed fiancé in Chicago, only to discover that the fiancé is married, so Anne is free to as she likes.

Inspired by the emotion of the royal wedding, the two couples decide that they will also be married that day. Thanks to the resourcefulness of Tom's London agent Edgar Klinger, who knows someone in the archbishop's office who can cut through the official red tape and also has a cooperative minister in his pocket, the couples are married.

== Cast ==
- Fred Astaire as Tom Bowen
- Jane Powell as Ellen Bowen
- Peter Lawford as Lord John Brindale
- Sarah Churchill as Anne Ashmond
- Keenan Wynn as Irving Klinger / Edgar Klinger
- Albert Sharpe as James Ashmond

== Production ==
Former dancer Charles Walters was the film's original director. Stanley Donen and Jane Powell were not part of the film's original crew and cast, and June Allyson had been cast as Astaire's costar. Allyson, who became pregnant, was replaced by Judy Garland over the objection of Walters, who had spent a year and a half nurturing Garland through her previous film, Summer Stock. Garland began to miss days of work, claiming sickness, as principal photography was to begin. Garland's behavior prompted Freed to replace her with Powell. According to Garland's biographer Gerold Frank, she was despondent about her career and personal life and asked MGM to be released from her contract. MGM agreed and the contract that had been signed in 1935 was nullified on September 28, 1950. Principal photography took place from July 6 to August 24, 1950, with retakes shot in mid-October.

The scene featuring the song "You're All the World to Me" was filmed by building a set inside a revolving barrel and using a novel camera mount, developed by MGM's John Arnold for use in this picture. MGM's "Revolving Camera Mount" permitted the 35mm camera to be rotated 360 degrees along the axis of its lens, in addition to being capable of pans and tilts. Astaire danced in the barrel set as if he were really dancing on the wall and ceiling. The scene inspired the Lionel Richie song "Dancing on the Ceiling" and its accompanying music video featuring Richie performing a similar dance.

== Music ==
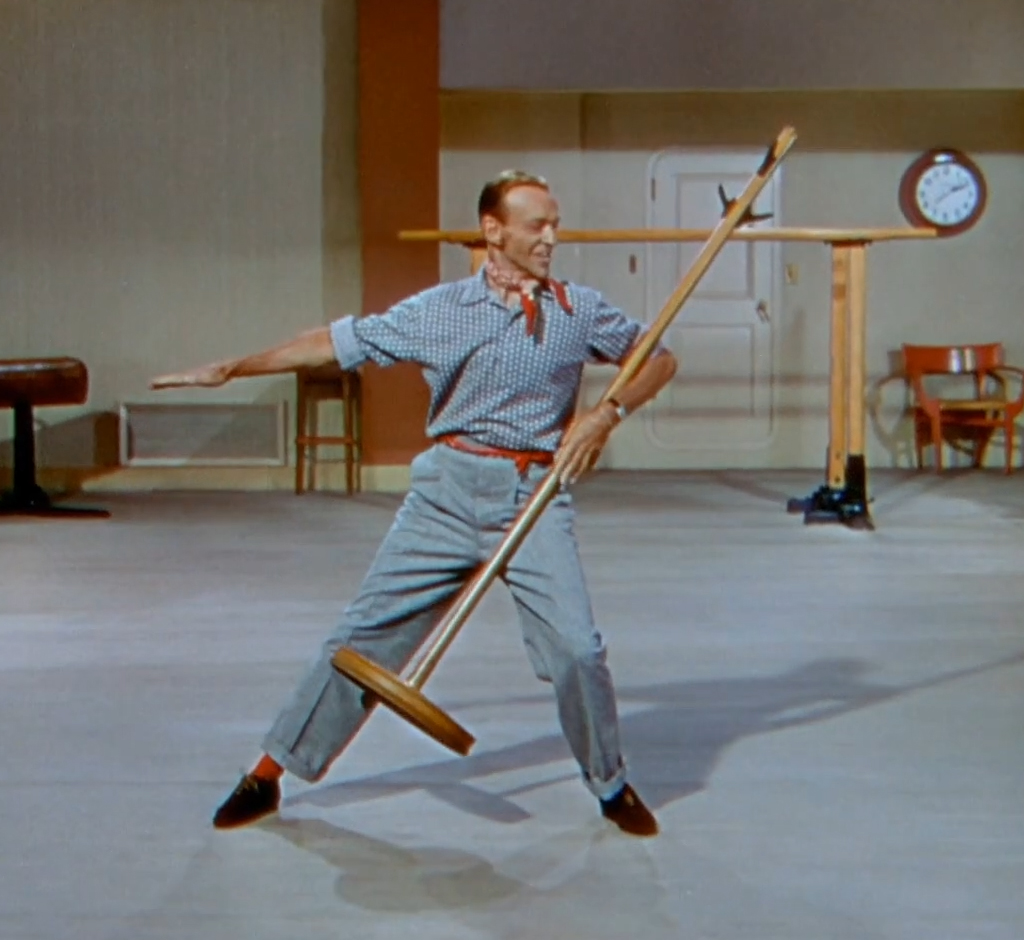
Astaire in "Sunday Jumps"

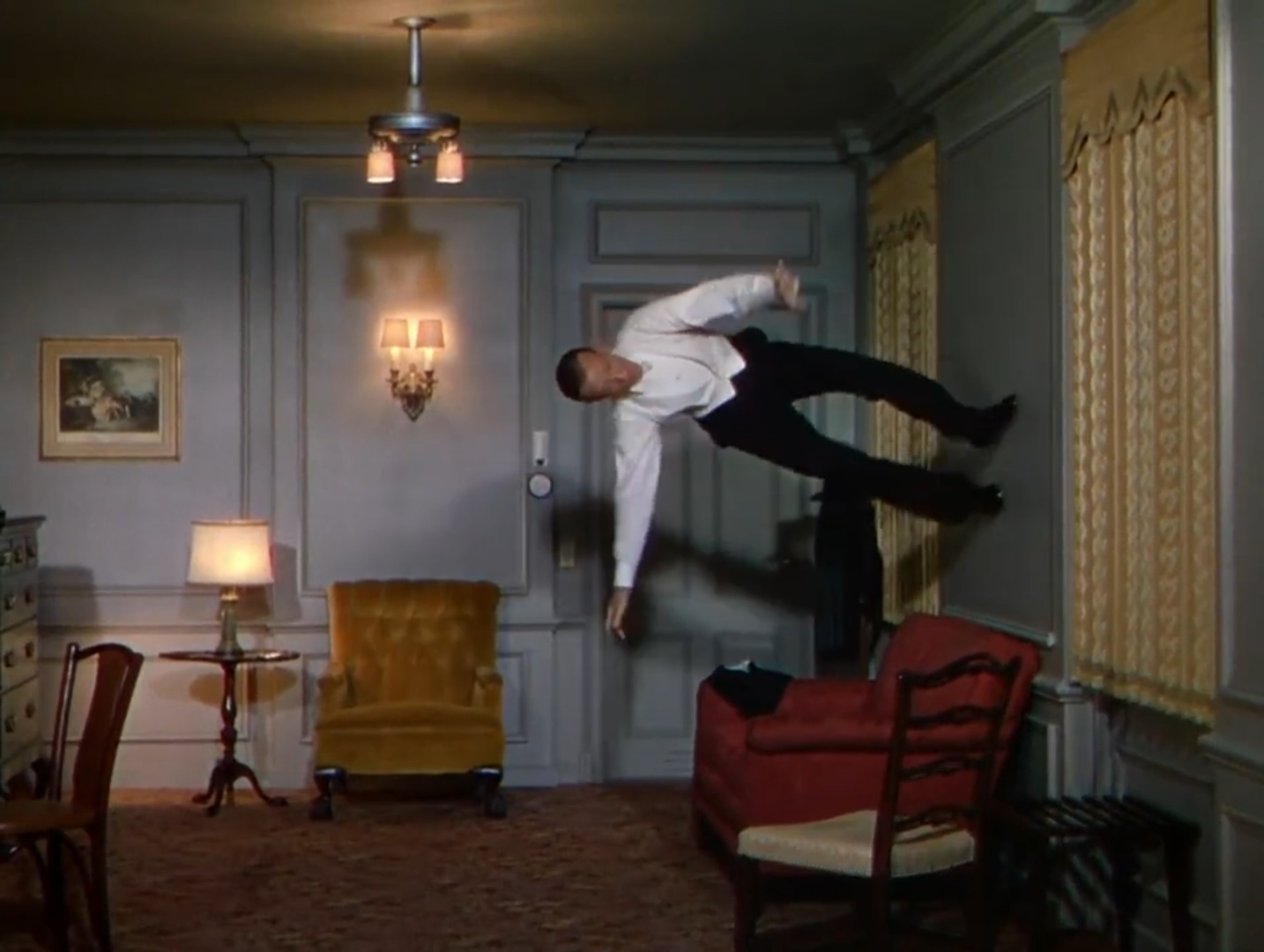
Astaire in "You're All the World to Me"

The songs heard in Royal Wedding were written by Burton Lane (music) and Alan Jay Lerner (lyrics). The dances were choreographed by Nick Castle.

- "Ev'ry Night at Seven": The film's opening number has Astaire and Powell perform from the "play within a play" Broadway musical that their characters are taking to London.
- "Sunday Jumps": Astaire parodies himself by dancing with a hat rack in a ship's gym. In 1997, after Astaire's widow Robyn authorized Dirt Devil to use a digitally altered version of the scene in a commercial, his daughter Ava publicly objected, stating that it "tarnish[ed] his image" and was "the antithesis of everything my lovely, gentle father represented".
- "Open Your Eyes": This waltz is sung by Powell at the beginning of a romantic routine danced by Powell and Astaire in front of an audience in the ballroom of a transatlantic liner. A storm rocks the ship and the duet is transformed into a comic routine with the dancers sliding to the ship's motions. This number is based on a real-life incident that happened to Astaire and his wife as they traveled by ship to London in 1923.
- "The Happiest Days of My Life": Powell's character sings this ballad to Lawford, with Astaire sitting at the piano.
- "How Could You Believe Me When I Said I Love You When You Know I've Been a Liar All My Life": The song's title is considered the longest of any song in MGM musical history.
- "Too Late Now": Powell sings her third ballad, this time an open declaration of love, to Lawford.
- "You're All the World to Me": Astaire dances on the walls and ceilings of his room because he has fallen in love with a beautiful woman who also loves to dance.
- "I Left My Hat in Haiti": This number, essentially the work of dance director Nick Castle, involves Powell, Astaire and chorus in a song-and-dance routine with a Caribbean theme.

The songs were published by MGM on a 10-inch long-play record.

== Reception ==
In a contemporary review for The New York Times, critic Bosley Crowther wrote: "The stars run no risk of being outsparkled by a film for which the best that we can say is that it has one swell number in it, built on the world's longest-titled song. But that's how it is with 'Royal Wedding'—one swell number, three or four that are good, a laugh here, a laugh there: colored newsreels of the British royal wedding and so long pal. Mr. Astaire has fared better in his lifetime and he has also fared much worse."

Critic Edwin Schallert of the Los Angeles Times wrote: "Excellent in songs and dances, so-so in story and particularly illumined by the presence of Fred Astaire and a new Jane Powell, 'Royal Wedding' yields entertainment sufficient to please most picturegoers. ... The production may best be classed as both interesting and pleasing, gaining esprit particularly through the work of its two major stars."

According to MGM records, the film earned $2,548,000 in the U.S. and Canada and $1,354,000 elsewhere, resulting in a profit to the studio of $584,000. The film was listed by Variety among the top box-office hits of 1951.

== Awards ==
"Too Late Now" was nominated for an Academy Award for Best Original Song at the 24th Academy Awards, losing to "In the Cool, Cool, Cool of the Evening" by Hoagy Carmichael and Johnny Mercer, from Here Comes the Groom.

The film was nominated for inclusion by the American Film Institute in two of its lists:

- 2002: AFI's 100 Years...100 Passions
- 2006: AFI's Greatest Movie Musicals

== Home media ==
In 2007, Warner Home Video released Royal Wedding in a DVD set as part of its Classic Musicals from the Dream Factory series.

The song "Sunday Jumps" was referenced by Mel Gibson in What Women Want and by David Byrne in the Talking Heads concert film Stop Making Sense. "Sunday Jumps" was also parodied by Kermit the Frog in The Great Muppet Caper.
