= The Lady's in Love with You =

"The Lady's in Love with You" is a popular song which was written by Burton Lane (music) and by Frank Loesser (lyrics). The song was published in 1939 and introduced in the film "Some Like It Hot" (1939) when it was sung by Bob Hope and Shirley Ross. Ms Ross also sang it in the film with Gene Krupa and His Band. The song was sung by Tony Bennett at his final concerts, at Radio City Music Hall, in 2021.

== Hit recordings ==
The song was a major hit in 1939 for the Glenn Miller orchestra, featuring a rare spoken interlude by Miller and vocal by Tex Beneke. Another to have a hit with the song in 1939 was Bob Crosby and His Orchestra.

== Other cover versions ==
The song has become a standard, recorded by many artists, including:

- Bob Hope and Shirley Ross, recorded for Decca (catalog No. 2568A) on June 16, 1939.
- Gene Krupa and His Orchestra, recorded for Brunswick Records (catalog No. 8340) on February 26, 1939.
- Benny Goodman and His Orchestra, for Victor Records (catalog No. 26211), recorded on April 7, 1939.
- Vince Guaraldi - Vince Guaraldi Trio (1956)
- Sammy Davis Jr. (Sammy Swings, 1957)
- Annie Ross, her 1957 recording was included as a bonus track on the CD reissue of the 1959 album Annie Ross Sings a Song with Mulligan!
- Doris Day (Cuttin' Capers, 1959)
- Bobby Cole (New! New! New! -The Unique Sounds Of The Bobby Cole Trio, 1960)
- Alma Cogan (1962) – included in the CD With Love in Mind (1988).
- Mel Tormé (Comin' Home Baby!, 1962).
- Sarah Vaughan (Sassy Swings the Tivoli, 1963)
- Tony Bennett (Tony Makes It Happen, 1967)
- Margaret Whiting, recorded for her album The Lady's in Love with You (1985).
- Maxine Sullivan – included in her album Maxine Sullivan Sings the Music of Burton Lane (1986).
- Michael Feinstein – for his album Michael Feinstein Sings the Burton Lane Songbook, Vol. 2 (1992)

In recent years, it was covered by John Pizzarelli and by Steven Pasquale. Tony Bennett would often sing this song during the Cheek to Cheek Tour for Lady Gaga's fourth costume change of the night.
