= Swing High, Swing Low (song) =

"Swing High, Swing Low" is a popular song written by Ralph Freed and Burton Lane, from the film of the same name. It was recorded by the Ink Spots in 1937.

It appeared in an episode of It Ain't Half Hot Mum, where Gunner Sugden sung it with Gunner Beaumont in drag on a swing.
