= Ken Bloom (writer) =

American dramatist

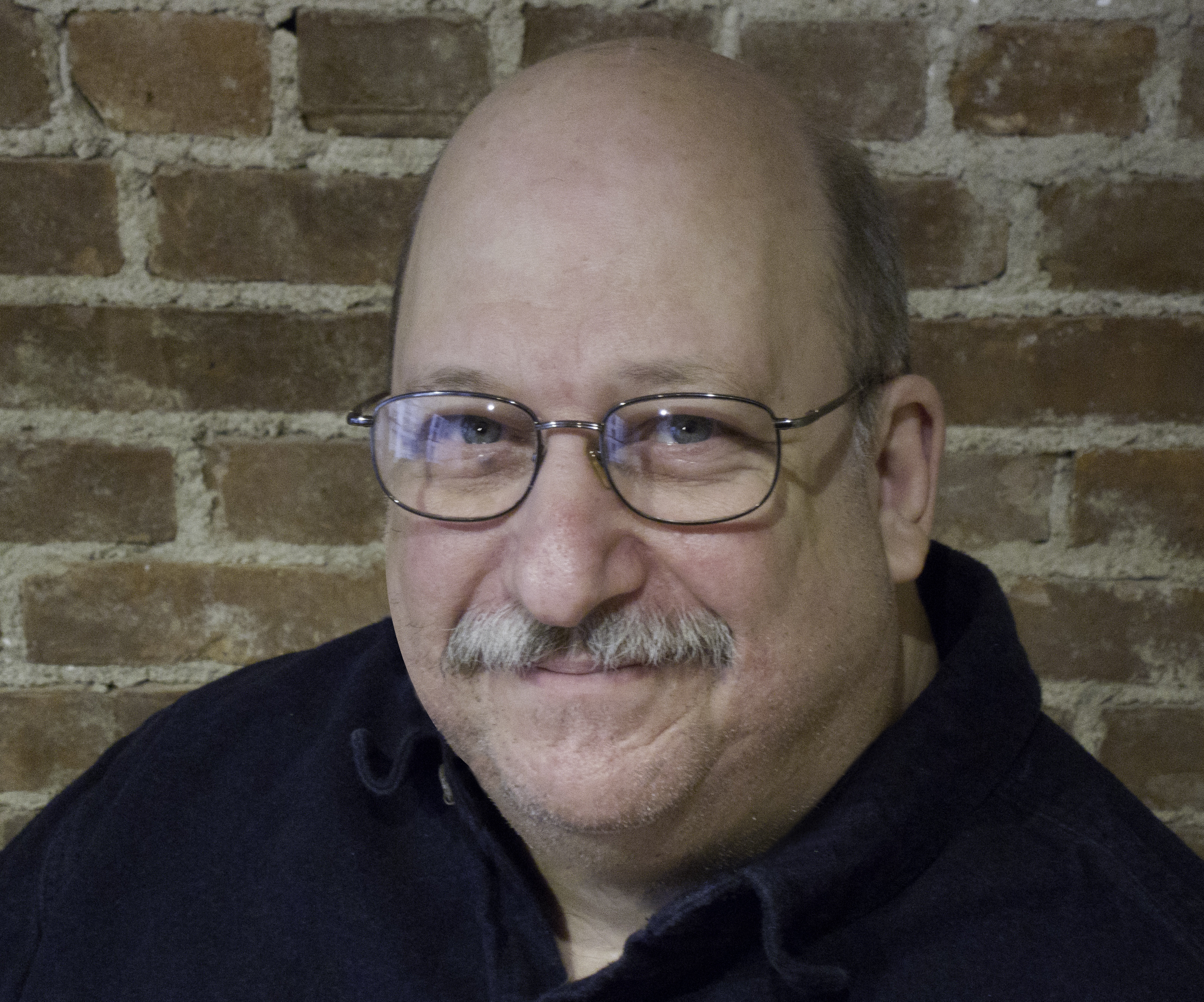

Ken Bloom is a New York-based, theatre historian, playwright, director, record producer, and author.

He began his theatre career in the mid-'70s at the New Playwrights Theatre of Washington. Along with some friends, Bloom co-founded the ASTA theatre. That company became the basis for New Playwrights. While at ASTA, Bloom joined the Smithsonian Puppet Theater, performing as part of Allan Stevens and Company in Washington and on tour throughout the United States for over two years. At New Playwrights, Bloom co-produced and directed a series of musicals and musical revues written by Tim Grundmann including Sirocco, Bride of Sirocco (which transferred to a commercial run), Nightmare!, Out to Lunch, and Eddie's Catchy Tunes. He also wrote and directed the musical revues Cole Porter Revisited, The Unsung Jerome Kern, and Sweet and Hot: The Songs of Harold Arlen. Bloom also was in charge of the theatre's PR, audience development, and marketing. After leaving New Playwrights, Bloom edited The Washington Season, an arts supplement for The Washington Post. In Washington, he hosted a musical theatre radio show for WAMU-FM, DC's NPR station.

He continued radio work after moving to New York in 1980 as a correspondent for Morning Edition and All Things Considered. He was also Broadway correspondent for the CBC. Bloom worked with Ezio Petersen on Musical Theatre Today on WKCR-FM, a weekly program that ran for fifteen years. He also hosted 12 hours a week for Sirius Satellite Radio's musical theatre channel.

Shortly after his move to New York, Bloom, in partnership with Cleveland's Bill Rudman, founded Harbinger Records, an independent label dedicated to the preservation of the music of American popular song, musical theatre, and cabaret. Their first release was Geraldine Fitzgerald’s one-woman show, Streetsongs. Bloom and Rudman's first studio record was Maxine Sullivan Sings the Great Songs of the Cotton Club by Harold Arlen and Ted Koehler. It was nominated for a Grammy Award for Best Jazz Vocalist and won the NAIRD award for Best Jazz Vocal of the Year. They continued working with Sullivan on the highly acclaimed Together: The Music of Jule Styne and The Lady's in Love with You: Maxine Sullivan Sings the Music of Burton Lane. Bloom has also produced albums devoted to the talents of Mabel Mercer, Susan Johnson, three CDs with jazz performer Barbara Carroll, three jazz CDs with pianist/singer Eric Comstock, Sylvia McNair, opera diva Amy Burton (Opera News Recording of the Month), Lorna Dallas, Eric Michael Gillette, Jamie DeRoy, Stacy Sullivan, Barbara Fasano, and Mark Murphy. Harbinger has also released on CD the Walden Records series of recordings as well as recordings by Noël Coward, Charles Strouse and Lee Adams, Richard Rodgers, Jerry Herman, Hugh Martin, Sheldon Harnick, Cy Coleman, Tom Jones and Harvey Schmidt, and Barry Kleinbort. In 2012, Harbinger co-produced Barry Kleinbort's musical 13 Things About Ed Carpolatti at the 59E59 Theater, starring Penny Fuller. In 2016, Bloom and Richard Carlin won a Grammy Award for Best Album Notes for the Harbinger recording Sissle and Blake Sing Shuffle Along, which Bloom also produced. In 2018, Harbinger Records celebrated its 35th anniversary.

Bloom's first book, American Song: The Complete Musical Theatre Companion is a listing of every song written for the American Theatre, which was named Reference Book of the Year by Choice Magazine. Ten years later, a new, updated edition was published. He followed it up with Hollywood Song which contains information on songs from over 7,000 films. His Tin Pan Alley features complete songographies of the top 175 composers and lyricists of American popular song. Bloom also wrote Broadway: An Encyclopedic Guide to the History, People, and Places of Times Square which won a Source Magazine Award and was named one of the top reference books of the year by the New York Times. An updated and revised edition was published in 1992. In collaboration with Frank Vlastnik, Bloom wrote the bestseller Broadway Musicals: The 101 Greatest Shows of All Time, which received the George Freedley Award and Sitcoms: The 101 Greatest Comedies of All Time. Bloom also wrote The American Songbook: The Singers, the Songwriters and the Songs. He also compiled, with Jerry Herman, Jerry Herman: The Lyrics: a Celebration. In 2009, with Elaine Orbach, Bloom wrote Remember How I Love You: Love Letters from an Extraordinary Marriage for Simon and Schuster. In 2010, Bloom wrote Hollywood Musicals: The 101 Greatest Song and Dance Movies of All Time. With Josh Wellman, Bloom wrote Attending and Enjoying Concerts for Pearson/Prentice Hall.Show and Tell: The New Book of Broadway Anecdotes (Oxford University Press) was published ij 2016. With co-author Richard Carlin, Bloom wrote "Eubie Blake: Rags, Rhythm, and Race" (Oxford University Press, 2020). His latest book is The Complete Lyrics of Sheldon Harnick. for SUNY New York Press. For more than a decade, Bloom was editor of Marquee, the journal of the Theatre Historical Society, during which time he sat on the board of that organization.

In 2010, Bloom was the Executive Producer of the three-part PBS series, Michael Feinstein's American Songbook. He also developed a website for the series. Also in 2010, an updated edition of Broadway Musicals: The 101 Greatest Shows of All Time was released.

Bloom consulted with Decca Broadway on their musical theatre catalog for nearly ten years. For such organizations as the Library of Congress and the Billy Rose Theatre Collection at Lincoln Center, Bloom cataloged the papers of such actors as Burton Lane, Florence Klotz, Peter Stone, and Jerry Herman.

With Barry Kleinbort, Bloom wrote the off-Broadway musical revue A Brief History of White Music which ran for a year at the Village Gate Uptown. Bloom and Kleinbort directed benefits for the Brooklyn Academy of Music, The New York City Opera, and Toys "R" Us featuring such performers as Patti LuPone, Carol Burnett, Marc Antony, Paul Anka, Wynonna Judd, Donna Murphy, Jerry Orbach, and Duncan Sheik.

In 2009, Bloom co-wrote with Kleinbort and Christopher Mirambeau a bi-lingual musical revue, Metropolita(i)n. It was produced at the Opera Paniche in Paris, France with a cast of French and American performers. The revue examined Parisian's views of New York City and New Yorker's views of Paris. The show was remounted in November 2010 at the Laurie Beechman Theatre in New York City with members of the French cast.

Bloom assisted Christophe Mirambeau in presenting a concert version of the previously lost Cole Porter revue, La Revue des Ambassadeurs; Mirambeau discovered Porter's lost songs, and the show reopened the Maison de la Mutualite on May 3, 2012, 85 years after its Parisian premiere. The thirty-member Orchestre des Concerts Pasdeloup played new orchestrations by Broadway orchestrator Larry Blank. A forty-member chorus and a cast of Parisians and Americans, including Amy Burton, Lisa Vroman, Jérôme Pradon, and Vincent Heden, performed the material. In 2014, Bloom and Vince Giordano found the original 1928 orchestrations and mounted the show at Town Hall in New York City for a sold-out performance; Amy Burton, Jason Graae, Anita Gillette, Tom Wopat, Catherine Russell, and Ted Louis Levy performed. Two years later, Bloom staged the show at San Francisco's historic Herbst Theatre.

2019 saw the release of the documentary, "Merely Marvelous: The Dancing Genius of Gwen Verdon", which Bloom co-wrote, co-directed and co-produced with filmmaker Christopher Johnson. The documentary was broadcast on the BBC and has been featured at film festivals; winning awards from the Burbank International Film Festival winners and the Rhode Island International Film Festival.

As a press agent, Bloom has represented Cirque du Soleil, the Bolshoi Theatre Grigorovich Balley, the Moscow Art Theatre, the Kirov Ballet, George Abbott's Broadway at the Royale Theatre on Broadway, and children's performers Sharon, Lois & Bram.
