= On Borrowed Time =

1939 film by Harold S. Bucquet

- VHS cover
- Directed by: Harold S. Bucquet
- Written by: Alice D. G. Miller; Frank O'Neill; Claudine West
- Based on: On Borrowed Time 1937 novel by Lawrence Edward Watkin; On Borrowed Time 1938 play by Paul Osborn
- Produced by: Sidney Franklin
- Starring: Lionel Barrymore; Cedric Hardwicke; Beulah Bondi; Una Merkel; Bobs Watson
- Cinematography: Joseph Ruttenberg
- Edited by: George Boemler
- Music by: Franz Waxman
- Distributed by: Metro-Goldwyn-Mayer
- Release date: July 6, 1939 (United States)
- Running time: 99 minutes
- Country: United States
- Language: English

On Borrowed Time is a 1939 drama film produced by Metro-Goldwyn-Mayer starring Lionel Barrymore, with Cedric Hardwicke, Beulah Bondi, Una Merkel, and Bobs Watson in support. Produced by Sidney Franklin and directed by Harold S. Bucquet, it is adapted from Paul Osborn's 1938 Broadway hit play. The play, based on a novel by Lawrence Edward Watkin, has been revived twice on Broadway since its original run.

== Plot ==
Mr. Brink, the elegant and aloof personification of death, takes Pud Northrup's parents in an auto wreck. Pud's wheelchair-using Gramps gives generously to the minister who delivered the eulogy, and Pud tells Gramps that because he has done a good deed, he can make a wish. Boys are constantly stealing Gramps' apples. He and Pud chase the latest perpetrator away, and he wishes that anyone who climbs up the tree will have to stay there until he permits them to climb down. Later, Pud inadvertently tests the wish, letting go of a branch only when Gramps says he can.

Pud's blue-nosed busybody Aunt Demetria, known to Gramps and Pud as a "pismire" ("the meanest ant there is"), has designs on Pud and his inheritance. Her condoling drives the boy to tears and Gramps to a near-fatal heart attack. While Pud fetches a glass of water, Mr. Brink comes for Gramps, saying it is time to go "where the woodbine twineth", the words Gramps used to tell Pud about death. Gramps refuses, as Pud needs him. Mr. Brink vanishes when Miss Nellie calls. Pud returns and asks who the stranger was.

Miss Nellie feels her age and worries about Gramps' influence on Pud. They quarrel, and Mr. Brink takes her peacefully, just before Gramps comes in to apologize. He is inconsolable until their housekeeper, Marcia, tells him Miss Nellie's last words: "Always see that Julian has his pipe." Reinvigorated, Gramps sees a lawyer about picking a future guardian for Pud, only to learn that Demetria is going to court to adopt the boy now.

When Mr. Brink returns for Gramps, the old man knows who it is and, to Pud's delight, tricks Mr. Brink into fetching an apple. While stuck in the tree, he cannot take Gramps—or anyone else. The only way anything can die is by touching the tree. When their beloved dog, Betty, does so, Gramps has a fence put up around the deadly tree.

Demetria plots to have Gramps committed to a psychiatric hospital when he claims that Death, now invisible, is trapped in his apple tree. Only Pud and Gramps can hear him. Gramps proves his story by holding a gun on his friend, Dr. Evans, and Grimes the orderly, who has come to take him to the asylum. Gramps demands that the doctor kill a fly, but he can't. Gramps shoots Grimes, who wakes up in the hospital hungry instead of dead. Elsewhere in the hospital, three patients are "on the brink, but they're holding their own."

Dr. Evans becomes a believer, but tries to convince Gramps to let Death down so suffering people can find release. Gramps refuses, so the doctor arranges for the sheriff to commit him. Pud is to be delivered to Demetria. Gramps, realizing that sooner or later he will have to give in, tries to say goodbye to a distraught Pud, who runs away.

A bird flies into the tree and dies. With Marcia's help, and over Mr. Brink's protests, Gramps tricks Demetria and the Sheriff into believing they are scheduled to go with Mr. Brink. They beg Gramps to convince Mr. Brink otherwise, and Demetria vows never to bother Gramps or Pud again. Marcia and Gramps search for Pud to tell him the good news.

Mr. Brink sees Pud in the yard and dares him to look him in the eye. Pud climbs to the top of the fence and falls. His agonizing injuries would be fatal, if Death were there to take him. Holding Pud in his lap, Gramps asks Mr. Brink to come down from the tree and take them both. They find they can walk again, and walk together up a beautiful country lane. They hear Miss Nellie calling to them from beyond a brilliant light, and Betty runs, barking, to meet them.

The closing text reads: "And so they lived happily for all eternity—which, as Gramps would say, is a right smart piece of time."

== Cast ==
- Lionel Barrymore as Julian Northrup (Gramps)
- Cedric Hardwicke as Mr. Brink
- Beulah Bondi as Nellie Northrup (Granny to Pud, Miss Nellie to Gramps)
- Una Merkel as Marcia Giles, the Northrups' housekeeper
- Bobs Watson as John 'Pud' Northrup
- Nat Pendleton as Mr. Grimes
- Henry Travers as Dr. James Evans
- Grant Mitchell as Ben Pilbeam, Gramps' lawyer
- Eily Malyon as Demetria Riffle, Pud's aunt
- James Burke as Sheriff Burlingame
- Charles Waldron as Reverend Murdock
- Ian Wolfe as Charles Wentworth
- Phillip Terry as Bill Lowry, Pilbeam's assistant and Marcia's boyfriend
- Truman Bradley as James Northrup, Pud's father

== Production ==
Frank Morgan was originally slated to play Gramps, until Barrymore convinced the studio he could play the part in spite of needing a wheelchair.

The story is a retelling of a Greek fable in which Death is tricked into climbing a pear tree which had been blessed by Saint Polycarp to trap anyone who was trying to steal an old woman's pears. The opening credits assert: "Mr. Chaucer liked the story and believed it—and so do we. If, perchance, you don't believe it, we respectfully insist that we [and Mr. Chaucer] must be right. Because faith still performs miracles and a good deed does find its just reward." According to TCM.com, this probably refers to Chaucer's "The Pardoner's Tale".

Set in small-town America, Barrymore plays crotchety wheelchair-using Julian Northrup ("Gramps"), who smokes a pipe, cherishes his dog, prefers fishing to churchgoing, occasionally takes a nip of "tonic", and indulges in mild profanity. He is a veteran of the Civil War (observing that they told him he was too young to serve) and of the Spanish-American War (referring to being at the Battle of San Juan Hill). Gramps and his wife, Nellie (played by Bondi), are raising their orphaned grandson, Pud, who adores his grandfather and mimics everything he does. Hardwicke plays Mr. Brink, the elegant and aloof personification of death.

Early in the film, Mr. Brink tells Gramps he is there to take him "where the woodbine twineth." This is a reference to an 1870 poem by Septimus Winner (under the pseudonym Apsley Street) euphemizing death, heaven, and the afterlife. Gramps dismissively tells Mr. Brink that's what people say to children. Gramps would have been a child himself around the 1870s, and would likely have heard that phrase in a popular song of that era. He also repeatedly refers to Aunt Demetria as a "pismire" ("the meanest ant there is"); indeed, pismire is an archaic term for ant, derived from the offensive smell of the formic acid ants produce.

== Reception ==
In his July 7, 1939, review in The New York Times, Frank S. Nugent said the film "isn't nearly so effective on the screen as it was on the stage", pointing out the "Hays code required the toning down of the salty dialogue that was at once the most comically shocking and endearing virtue" of Gramps and Pud. According to Nugent:

The picture, like the play, is a tender thing and wistful, fantastic in its way, yet firmly rooted in human soil. It is absurd and it is charming and it is not at all stupendous. And it has, we are pleased to report, a company of players who have fallen admirably under the spell of their drama's mood. Best among them, to our mind, are Beulah Bondi's Granny, young Bobs Watson's Pud, Cedric Hardwicke's Mr. Brink and Eily Malyon's Aunt Dimmy. Mr. Barrymore's Gramps is well enough, we suppose. It is probably unfair to hold his Lionel Barrymorism against him.
