= Herminie Templeton Kavanagh =

British writer

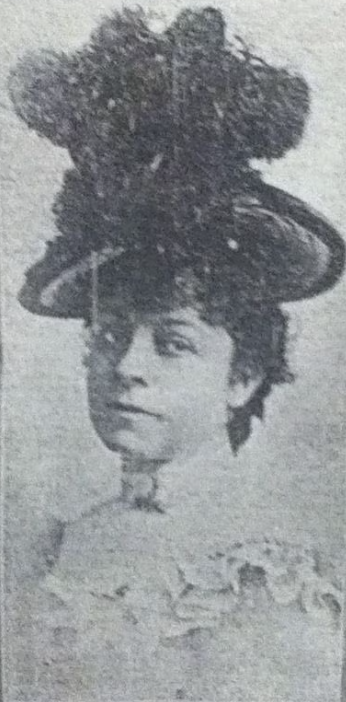
- Born: Minnie Allen McGibney; 6 May 1861; Aldershot, Hampshire, United Kingdom
- Died: 30 October 1933 (aged 72); Chicago, Illinois, United States
- Resting place: New York, USA
- Spouse(s): John Templeton; Judge Marcus Kavanagh
- Writing career
- Notable works: Darby O'Gill and the Good People (ISBN 0-9666701-0-8); Ashes of Old Wishes and Other Darby O'Gill Tales (ISBN 0-8369-4018-0); The Color Sergeant (1903); Swift-Wing of the Cherokee (1903)

Herminie Templeton Kavanagh (6 May 1861 – 30 October 1933) was a British writer, most known for her short stories.

== Early life and family ==
Born Minnie Allen McGibney at the British army barracks in Aldershot, England, on 6 May 1861, she was the second of seven children born to Major George McGibney from Templemichael, County Longford, Ireland, and Caroline Allen from Coventry, England.

The family moved to Quebec, Canada in 1872. By 1880 Minnie lived in Manhattan with her widowed mother and six siblings and worked as a sales clerk.

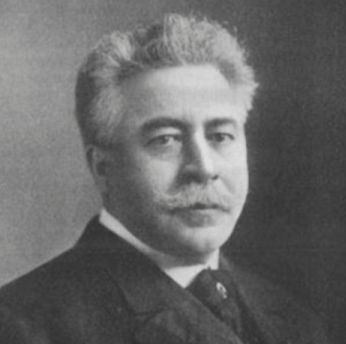
Marcus Kavanagh (second husband)

Her first marriage was to vaudeville performer John Templeton. An article in the Chicago Tribune later stated that she had been abandoned by her first husband in Chicago circa 1893. After their separation, Minnie worked in Chicago as a clerk and stenographer. She adopted the name Herminie some time before 1900, and published her first writing in 1901.

She became Herminie Templeton Kavanagh after her second marriage, to Marcus Kavanagh (1859–1937), who was born in the United States to Irish immigrants, and who served as a Cook County judge in Chicago from 1898 to 1935. Accounts differ on how they met, as well as where and when they married, ranging from 1905 to 1908 in Dublin or Iowa. (Note: In July 1908, the Tribune announced that they would be married at his parents' church in Des Moines, Iowa, but that the judge was "reticent as to the details." Another article in the Tribune, several weeks later, said that Mrs. Templeton had been abandoned by her first husband in Chicago circa 1893. In the course of the clerical work in the city recorder's office by which she supported herself, she met Judge Kavanagh, and they were to be married at the church in County Waterford, Ireland where his parents had been married. "It is said there has been a silent understanding and a wait of over ten years" until John Templeton's death in 1907, the article explained. But the following day, the Tribune reported that they were married in Dublin, Ireland on 19 August 1908, by a monsignor from Des Moines, Iowa. But according to her 1933 obituary in the same newspaper, they met in Ireland in 1907 while the judge was touring Europe and she was gathering material for a book, and they married on 19 August 1908, at his parents' church in Des Moines. Judge Kavanagh's listing in Who Was Who in America (1943) said that they were married on 19 August 1905.)

She and Judge Kavanagh lived together in Chicago and Ocean Grove, New Jersey.

== Works ==
Her best known work, Darby O'Gill and the Good People (ISBN 0-9666701-0-8), was first published as a series of stories under the name Herminie Templeton in McClure's magazine in 1901–1902, before being published as a book in the United States in 1903. A second edition, published a year before her death, was under the name Herminie T. Kavanagh. The Good People in the title refers to the fairies in Irish mythology; the English translation of aoine maithe is good people.

Her second published book, Ashes of Old Wishes and Other Darby O'Gill Tales (ISBN 0-8369-4018-0), was published in 1926. In 1959, Walt Disney released a film based on these two books, called Darby O'Gill and the Little People.

She also wrote two plays, The Color Sergeant (1903), and Swift-Wing of the Cherokee (1903).

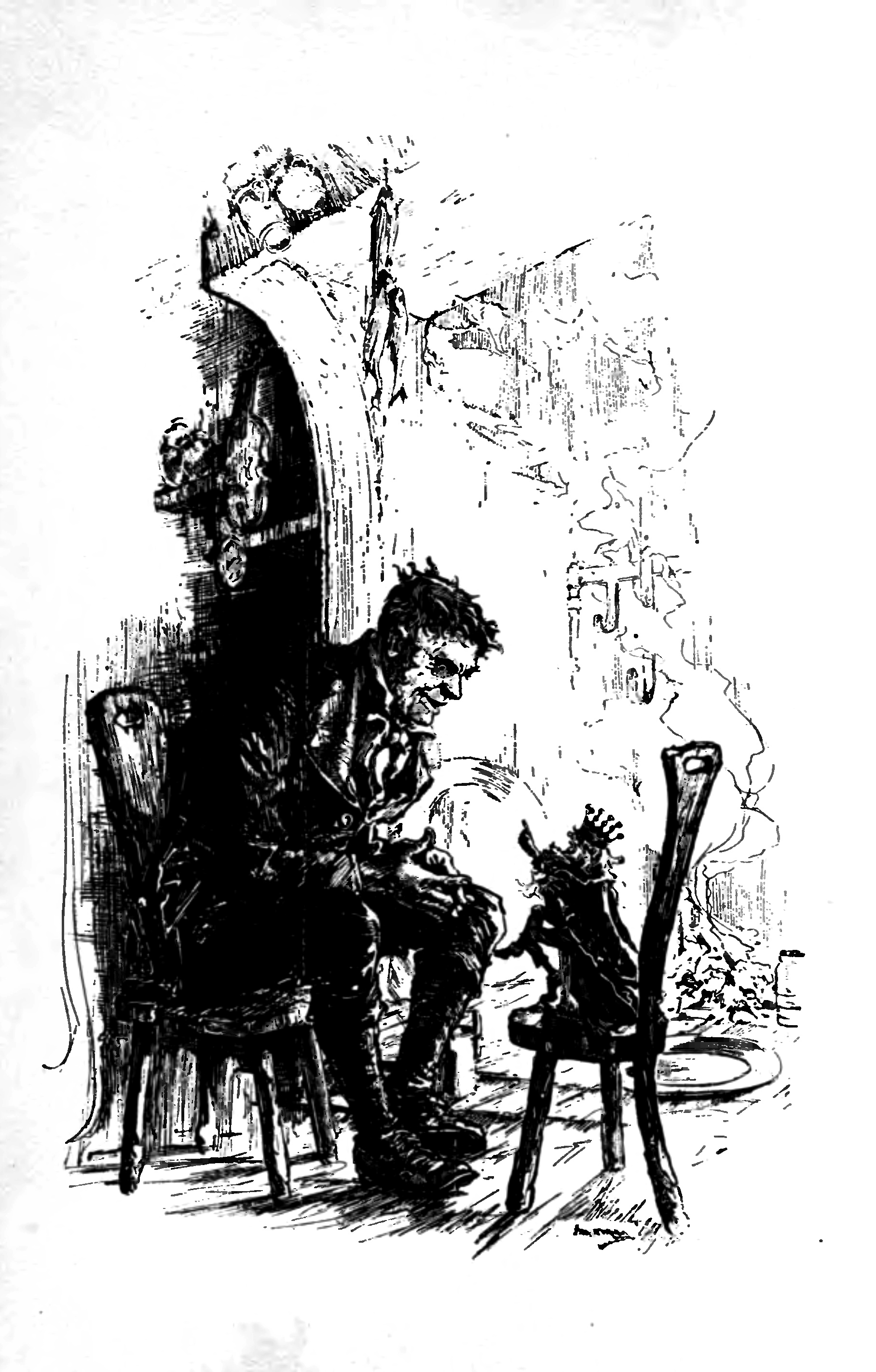
Darby O'Gill and the Good People 1903 illus. by John R. Neill

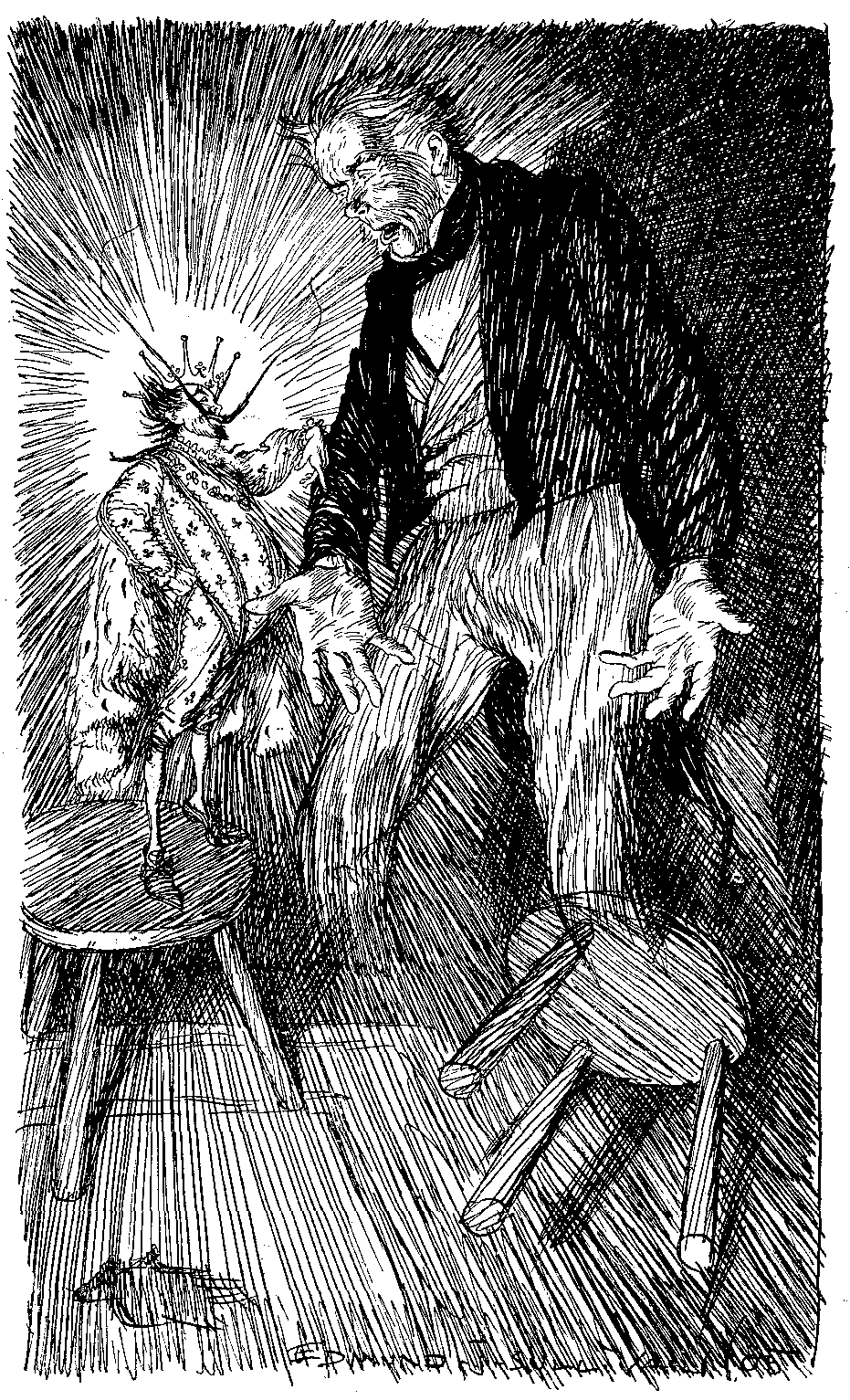
The Ashes of Old Wishes 1906 illus. by Edmund J. Sullivan

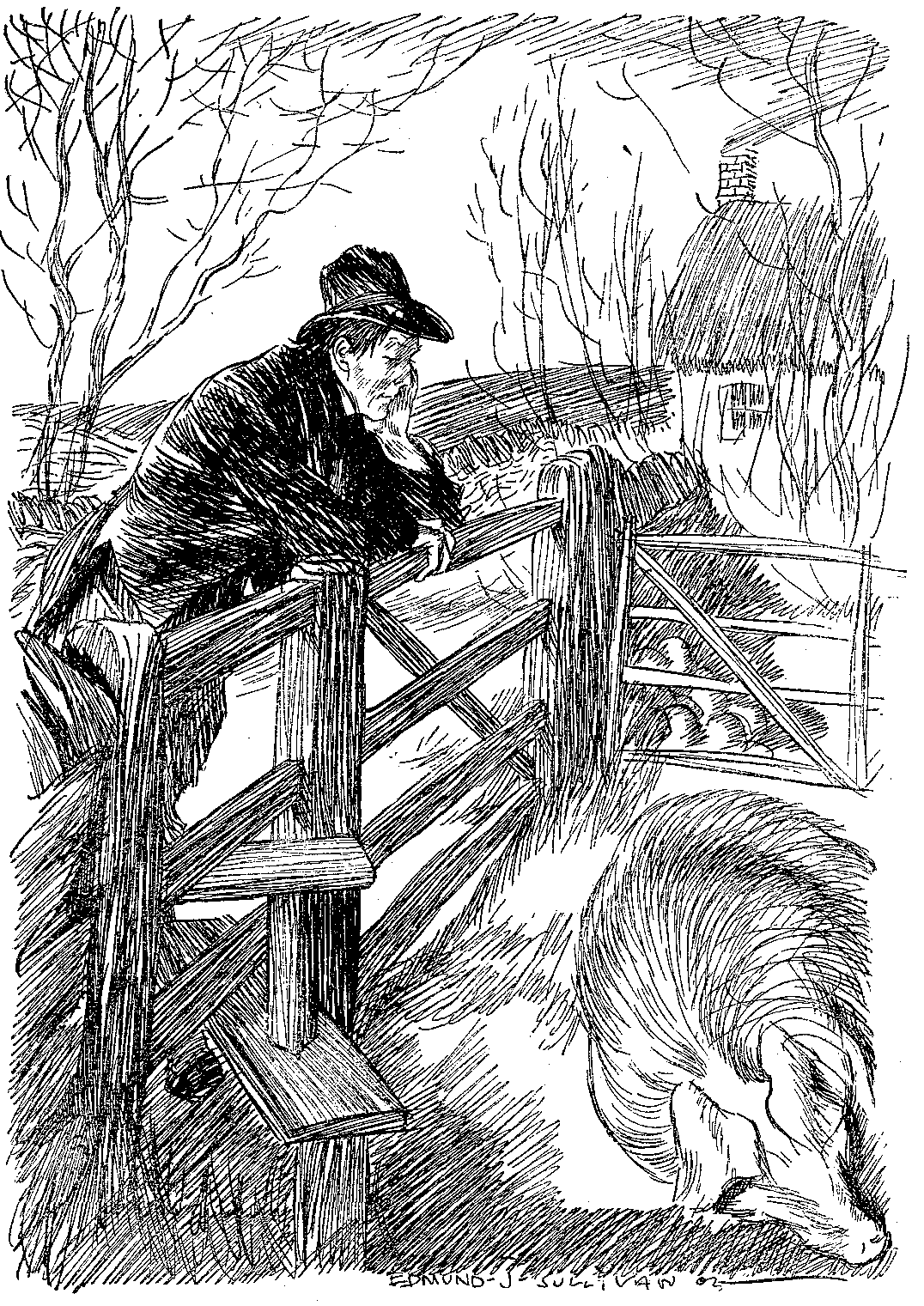
Killbohgan and Killboggan 1906 illus. by Edmund J. Sullivan

== Death ==
She died of a heart ailment in Chicago on 30 October 1933, aged 72. She was buried in New York, her former home.
