= Michael Feinstein Sings the Jule Styne Songbook =

Studio album by Michael Feinstein
- Released: 1991
- Recorded: 1991
- Genre: Vocal jazz
- Length: 56:49
- Label: Elektra

Michael Feinstein chronology
Michael Feinstein Sings the Burton Lane Songbook, Vol. 1 (1991)	Michael Feinstein Sings the Jule Styne Songbook (1991)	Pure Imagination (1992)

Michael Feinstein Sings the Jule Styne Songbook is a 1991 album by American vocalist Michael Feinstein of songs written by Jule Styne. The composer is at the piano.

== Track listing ==
No.	Title	Writer(s)	Length
1.	"People"	Bob Merrill	1:06
2.	"I've Heard That Song Before"	Sammy Cahn	1:07
3.	"I Know About Love"	Betty Comden, Adolph Green	2:07
4.	"Let's See What Happens"	Yip Harburg	1:49
5.	"I Don't Want to Walk Without You"	Frank Loesser	2:18
6.	"Nice She Ain't"	Stephen Sondheim	1:47
7.	"Home Is the Place"	Sondheim	3:08
8.	"A Little Girl from Little Rock"	Leo Robin	2:33
9.	"Come Out, Come Out, Wherever You Are"	Cahn	2:04
10.	"Who Are You Now?"	Merrill	1:47
11.	"Not Mine"	Styne	1:59
12.	"The Music That Makes Me Dance"	Merrill	2:24
13.	"Gypsy: Overture"	Sondheim	1:52
14.	"Small World"	Sondheim	2:18
15.	"You'll Never Get Away from Me"	Sondheim	1:09
16.	"All I Need Is the Girl"	Sondheim	1:09
17.	"Everything's Coming Up Roses"	Sondheim	1:04
18.	"I Fall in Love Too Easily"	Cahn	2:16
19.	"Look at You, Look at Me"	Loesser	2:41
20.	"The Guy in the Polka Dotted Tie"	Sol Meyer	1:00
21.	"I Guess I'll Hang My Tears Out to Dry"	Cahn	3:10
22.	"Some Other Time"	Cahn	1:22
23.	"Just in Time"	Comden, Green	1:20
24.	"It's Been a Long, Long Time"	Cahn	1:09
25.	"Sunday"	Chester Conn, Benny Krueger, Ned Miller, Styne	1:16
26.	"Long Before I Knew You"	Comden, Green	1:16
27.	"The Party's Over"	Comden, Green	1:20
28.	"Make Someone Happy"	Comden, Green	1:28
29.	"I'll Walk Alone"	Cahn	1:05
30.	"It's Magic"	Cahn	0:55
31.	"The Things We Did Last Summer"	Cahn	1:07
32.	"Time After Time"	Cahn	1:35
33.	"Melody from The Red Shoes"		1:39

All music composed by Jule Styne, lyricists indicated.

== Personnel ==
- Michael Feinstein – vocals
- Jule Styne – piano
