= Pure Imagination (Michael Feinstein album) =

Studio album by Michael Feinstein
- Released: 1992
- Recorded: 1992
- Genre: Vocal jazz, Pop, Children's, Stage & Screen
- Length: 59:48
- Label: Elektra

Michael Feinstein chronology
Michael Feinstein Sings the Burton Lane Songbook, Vol. 2 (1992)	Pure Imagination (1992)	Michael Feinstein Sings the Jerry Herman Songbook (1993)

Pure Imagination is a 1992 album by American vocalist Michael Feinstein of songs for children.

== Personnel ==
- Michael Feinstein – vocals, piano
- Composition and Lyrics: Leslie Bricusse, Anthony Newley
