= Burton Lane =

American composer (1912–1997)

Background information
- Born: Burton Levy; February 2, 1912; New York City, New York
- Died: January 5, 1997 (aged 84) New York City, New York
- Occupation: Composer

Burton Lane (born Levy; February 2, 1912 – January 5, 1997) was an American composer primarily known for his theatre and film scores. His most popular and successful works include the Broadway musicals Finian's Rainbow (1947) and On a Clear Day You Can See Forever (1965).

Born in Manhattan, Lane was a talented performer and composer from childhood. His skill led to friendship with George Gershwin and the Gershwin family; Lane considered George to be his greatest influence. Lane began his career writing popular songs and music for Broadway shows in his teens.

The Great Depression sent Lane to Hollywood, where he worked for Paramount Pictures and other studios for more than twenty years. He wrote songs with lyricists including Harold Adamson, Ralph Freed, and Frank Loesser. Some of their songs became popular successes and jazz standards, including "Everything I Have Is Yours", "I Hear Music" and "How About You?". Lane also claimed to have discovered Judy Garland performing with her sisters in a Hollywood theater.

Lane resumed writing for Broadway in 1940. Besides Finian's Rainbow and On a Clear Day, he wrote music for several other shows, one of which, Carmelina (1979), was nominated for a Tony Award for Best Original Score. Though Lane had been prolific in Hollywood, his extreme care in choosing projects, and differences and difficulties with the lyricists with whom he worked, limited the number of his successes on Broadway.

In later life Lane became a leader in his profession of songwriting. As a long-serving president of the American Guild of Authors and Composers and a director of ASCAP, he fought to preserve the ability of songwriters to earn royalties on their works.

== Biography ==
=== Early life ===
Burton Lane was born Burton Levy, in Manhattan, New York City, on February 2, 1912, to Lazarus and Frances Fink Levy. (Note: The Harvard Biographical Dictionary of Music gives Lane's birth name as "Morris Hyman Kushner", but it appears to be in error, as no other source does so.) When a teenager, Burton changed his surname to Lane at the suggestion of someone with whom he was auditioning, and his brother and cousins followed suit.

Lane's parents loved music, and his mother played piano, but she died when Burton was two years old. He studied piano, viola and cello as a child, and composed two marches for his school band which were published. At age 14 the theatrical producers the Shuberts commissioned him to write songs for a revue, The Greenwich Village Follies. That show was canceled, but Lane remained committed to music. He played piano so well that, when his father pushed him to play in public in a boarding house in Atlantic City during the winter holidays, George Gershwin's mother introduced herself to the Lanes, and Burton subsequently met George, his lyricist brother Ira, and Ira's best friend Yip Harburg, Burton's future collaborator.

A friend of Lane's knew the lyricist Joe Young, who was working for the music publisher J.H. Remick. Young asked Lane to compose a tune for one of his lyrics, which Lane did on the spot. Young was impressed, recommended Lane to Remick's, and Lane dropped out of high school to compose for them.

At the age of 18, Lane began his Broadway career when he composed "My Real Ideal" and "Two Perfect Lovers" for the 1930 edition of the revue Artists and Models, and two songs used in the revue Three's a Crowd: "Forget All Your Books" and "Out in the Open Air." In the post-Depression Broadway slump Lane was only able to contribute to a few more shows. Lane and Harold Adamson wrote the songs for The Earl Carroll Vanities of 1931, and Lane placed songs written with Adamson or Harburg in several other shows. He continued writing and publishing single songs; two that had some success were "Look Who's Here" and "Tony's Wife", both with lyrics by Adamson.

Lane's early days on Tin Pan Alley and Broadway ended when his employer, Irving Berlin Inc., sent him and Adamson to Hollywood for six weeks, and Lane remained there for 21 years.

=== Career and notable works ===
Lane wrote the majority of his music for films, more than 60 of them. (Note: Hollywood Song credits Lane with 84 films, but for 16 of them lists only songs that are noted as having been previously released.) He and Adamson wrote songs together freelance for several different studios from 1933 to 1936. In 1933 their song "Everything I Have Is Yours" was introduced in Dancing Lady and became a hit.

In 1935, according to Lane, he discovered the 13-year-old Judy Garland. (Note: Frances Gumm and her sisters began performing under stage names in 1934.) He caught her sisters' act at the Paramount theater in downtown Los Angeles, which featured a live stage show along with the movie. The older sisters, Suzy and Jimmy, brought on their younger sister Judy. Lane immediately called the head of the music department at MGM and told him he'd just heard a great new talent. The head told Lane to have her brought in for an audition. Lane went backstage and arranged an audition with the girls' father. The head of MGM, Louis B. Mayer, was so impressed by Garland's audition that he ordered every producer, director and writer to hear her, with the result that the audition, which began at 9:30 am, finished at 7:30 pm, and MGM signed her. Lane left MGM soon after and worked with other studios and projects for some years. When he finally worked together with Garland, on Babes on Broadway in 1941, she remembered him and thanked him. Other people also claimed to have arranged that audition, and their and Garland's accounts differ from Lane's.

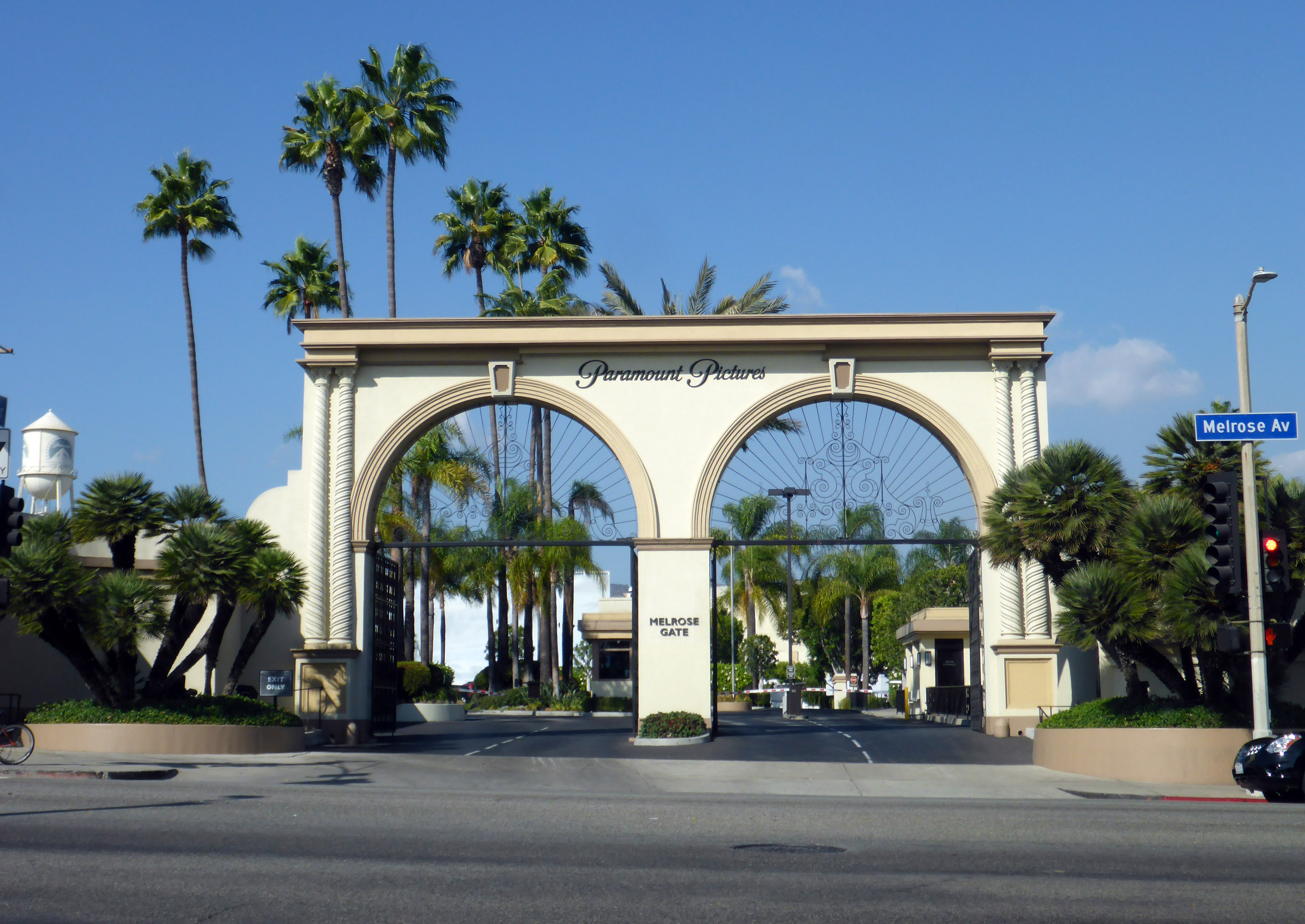
Paramount Studios, where Lane wrote songs from 1936 to 1941

Lane worked for Paramount Pictures from 1936 to 1941, at first primarily with lyricist Ralph Freed. Their biggest success together was the hit "How About You?", in which Mickey Rooney and Judy Garland's characters got to know each other in Babes on Broadway; it was nominated for an Academy Award for Best Original Song. In 1938, Lane's agent introduced him to two other clients, Frank Loesser and Manning Sherwin, and Lane heard a couple of their songs. Lane was especially impressed by Loesser's lyrics. Lane introduced the two to a producer at Paramount, Lew Gensler, and they were signed to a ten-week contract. Loesser soon began writing songs with Lane. They had many successes at Paramount, including the standards "The Lady's in Love with You" and "I Hear Music". Lane also recommended to Paramount the then-unknown Mary Martin, whom he had heard in a cabaret show, though they didn't sign her until after her successful Broadway debut.

Lane worked for a number of studios in the 1940s and 1950s. His most notable film in that period was Royal Wedding (1951), with lyrics by Alan Jay Lerner, from which "Too Late Now" was nominated for a Best Song Academy Award. Lane said that it was the only time in Hollywood that he'd been allowed, by producer Arthur Freed, to work with the star, Fred Astaire, to plan the musical numbers, and to write the kind of songs he wanted to write.

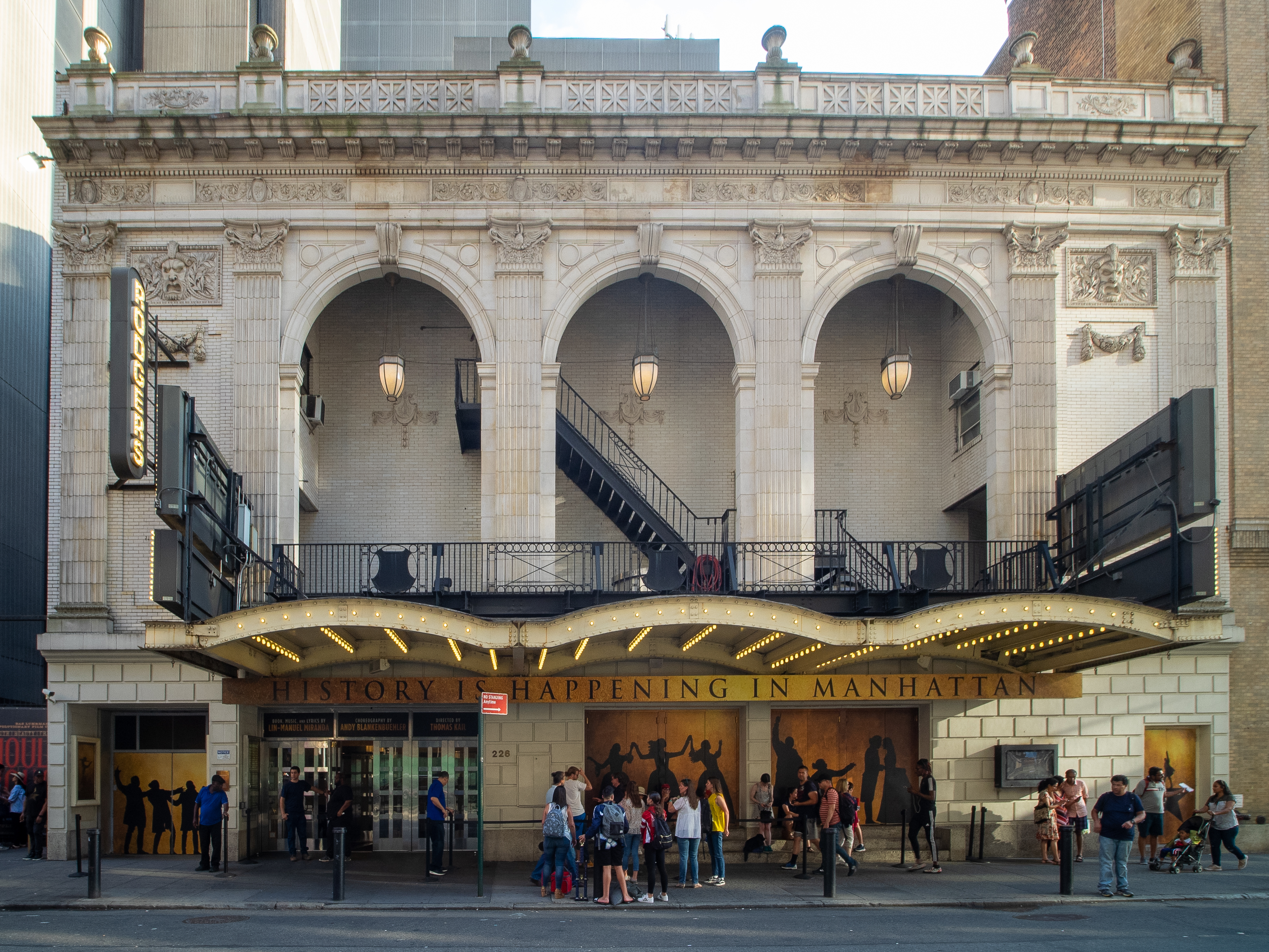
Broadway's 46th Street Theatre, where Finian's Rainbow premiered in 1947

Despite his prolific output in Hollywood, Lane was most celebrated for two of his Broadway musicals. He composed the first, Finian's Rainbow, in 1947. Harburg co-wrote the libretto and wrote the lyrics. It has been revived four times on Broadway and twice off-Broadway. Songs from it including "Old Devil Moon", "How Are Things in Glocca Morra?" and "If This Isn't Love" have been recorded many times. It was made into a film in 1968.

Lane's second acclaimed musical was On a Clear Day You Can See Forever, in 1965. Lerner wrote the libretto and lyrics. Though Lerner's libretto was not well received, and the show only ran for a middling 280 performances, it was nominated for a Tony Award for Best Original Score, and Lane and Lerner shared a Grammy Award for Best Score from an Original Cast Show Album for its cast album. Its title song and "Come Back to Me" have been widely recorded. The show was adapted to film in 1970, with some new and revised songs by Lane and Lerner.

Lane also wrote the music for the less remembered Broadway shows Hold On to Your Hats (1940, also with Harburg), Laffing Room Only (1944), for which he himself also wrote almost all of the lyrics, (Note: American Song credits Lane with the lyrics for Laffing Room Only, but Loesser as a co-lyricist on "Feudin' and Fightin'". Show Tunes claims that Frank Loesser ghost-wrote the show's lyrics but couldn't take credit for them because he was in the Army at the time.) and Carmelina (1979, also with Lerner). Carmelina's libretto was also criticized, and it closed quickly, but it was also nominated for a Tony Award for Best Original Score.

Lane's output was notably sparse after his film work declined in the 1950s. He said that it was difficult to find a libretto that inspired a show's worth of varied songs. He was hired to compose Arms and the Girl (1950), for which Dorothy and Herbert Fields had written a libretto. Immediately after reading it he left the project, telling them that he honestly felt the script was inadequate. A few years later he was signed to score the Fieldses' By the Beautiful Sea (1954), but again quickly bowed out. He chose not to work with Harburg on Flahooley (1951) because he felt Harburg had packed too much politics into the libretto for there to be any human interest, and "good songs come out of people". Lane passed up properties for other reasons as well: He and Harburg turned down Hello, Dolly! (1964) because it didn't have enough social significance to interest Harburg.

Lane did finally collaborate with Dorothy Fields on the made-for-television musical Junior Miss, which aired on CBS on December 20, 1957. His last major work, on which he collaborated for the first time with noted lyricist Sammy Cahn, was the animated musical Heidi's Song (1982).

=== Personal and professional life ===
Lane married Marian Seaman in 1935. They had a daughter around 1943, who had an intellectual disability. Though long, their marriage was not happy; in 1961 they finally divorced and he married Lynn Baroff Kaye, who had three daughters from an earlier marriage.

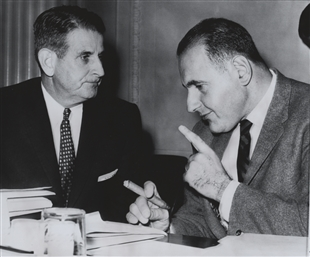
November 4, 1959. Reps. Oren Harris (left) and Steven B. Derounian, to whose committee Lane sent charges of payola.

In 1957 Lane was drafted to be president of the American Guild of Authors and Composers. He served for ten terms, during which period he inaugurated a system of auditing music publishers' books to ensure that songwriters were paid their fair share of royalties. He also served three terms on the board of directors of the American Society of Composers, Authors and Publishers (ASCAP). In 1959 he wrote on behalf of the Guild to the House subcommittee investigating payola in the music business, accusing publishers of bribing disk jockeys to play the publishers' songs. The cases he cited implied that payola promoted rock and roll, usually published by members of ASCAP's rival BMI, at the expense of other genres more often represented by ASCAP. In 1966 the Guild honored his work with its first Sigmund Romberg Award. He was inducted into the Songwriters Hall of Fame in 1972, elected its director in 1973, and awarded its highest honor, the Johnny Mercer Award, in 1992.

He died at his home in Manhattan on January 5, 1997.

Lane was raised in a largely Jewish environment, had to defend himself against anti-semitism as a boy, and received training for his bar mitzvah. He considered himself Jewish throughout his life. But, near the end of his life, he had no formal association with any Jewish organization. In a 2009 interview, his widow stated that "I don’t think there was anything, of any real consequence, that Burton and Yip [Harburg, an avowed atheist] disagreed about."

== Musical style ==
Lane normally composed music to which a lyricist would then add words. But he would do so knowing what sort of song a scene called for, and sometimes the librettist or lyricist would have chosen a title which needed to fit rhythmically into the music. Sometimes Lane would suggest a place in a show that would benefit from a song. So he was "as responsible really as the lyricist ... or the librettist" for a show's choice and style of songs.

"I don't know what my style is", Lane claimed in an interview, and he insisted that his personal life never showed in his work. The noted critic Alec Wilder said that Lane had "no specific stylistic devices". But Lane said repeatedly that, though he never actually worked with him, George Gershwin was his biggest influence, in particular in how he used surprise in his music. "George was always interesting. Everything he did was always filled with delicious surprises, wonderful surprises." Yip Harburg said that Lane was the composer who came closest to Gershwin's "effervescence". Wilder cites many examples of musical surprises in Lane's compositions. Gershwin also inspired Lane to not pander to current commercial tastes, but to write quality songs.

Lane noticed that the Gershwins did better work when they had better librettos to work from, and was very particular about the librettos he chose to work from. He said, "I've always looked for properties that had either a background that was interesting or marvelous characters that could be caught musically, because I think, when you have that, it helps give a personality to the score that otherwise you might not have ... This is the pain of my life, trying to find good stories that lend themselves to musicals."

== Works ==
=== Stage shows ===
- Artists and Models (revue, 1930). Contributed two songs, lyrics by Sammy Lerner.
- Three's a Crowd (revue, 1930). Contributed two songs, lyrics by Howard Dietz.
- The Third Little Show (revue, 1931). Contributed "Say the Word", lyrics by Harold Adamson.
- Earl Carroll's Vanities (revue, 1931). Lyrics by Harold Adamson.
- Singin' the Blues (play, 1931). Contributed "Crazy Street", lyrics by Harold Adamson.
- Hold On to Your Hats (musical, 1940). Lyrics by Yip Harburg.
- Laffing Room Only (revue, 1944). Lyrics by Burton Lane.
- Finian's Rainbow (musical, 1947). Lyrics by Yip Harburg.
- Jollyanna and The Little Doll Laughed (revisions of Flahooley, 1952). Lyrics by Yip Harburg.
- On a Clear Day You Can See Forever (musical, 1965). Lyrics by Alan Jay Lerner. Nominated for Tony Award for Best Original Score.
- We Bombed in New Haven (play, 1968). Contributed "Bomb, Bomb, Bombing Along", lyrics by the playwright, Joseph Heller.
- Carmelina (musical, 1979). Lyrics by Alan Jay Lerner. Nominated for Tony Award for Best Original Score

=== Selected films ===
Lane wrote several original songs for each of these films.

- Dancing Lady (1933). Lyrics by Harold Adamson.
- Bottoms Up (1934). Lyrics by Harold Adamson.
- Here Comes the Band (1935). Lyrics by Harold Adamson and Ned Washington.
- College Holiday (1936). Lyrics by Ralph Freed and Leo Robin).
- Cocoanut Grove (1938). Lyrics by Frank Loesser and Ralph Freed.
- College Swing (1938). Lyrics by Frank Loesser.
- Spawn of the North (1938). Lyrics by Frank Loesser and Sam Coslow.
- St. Louis Blues (1939). Lyrics by Frank Loesser.
- She Married a Cop (1939). Lyrics by Ralph Freed.
- Dancing on a Dime (1940). Lyrics by Frank Loesser.
- Babes on Broadway (1941). Lyrics by Yip Harburg and Ralph Freed.
- Las Vegas Nights (1941). Lyrics by Frank Loesser.
- Ship Ahoy (1942). Lyrics by Yip Harburg.
- Rainbow Island (1944) Lyrics by Ted Koehler.
- Royal Wedding (1951). Lyrics by Alan Jay Lerner.
- Give a Girl a Break (1953). Lyrics by Ira Gershwin.
- Jupiter's Darling (1955). Lyrics by Harold Adamson.
- On a Clear Day You Can See Forever (1970). Lyrics by Alan Jay Lerner.
- Heidi's Song (1982). Lyrics by Sammy Cahn.

He contributed original songs to many other films.

=== Notable songs ===
- "Everything I Have Is Yours". Lyrics by Harold Adamson. From the 1933 film Dancing Lady.
- "Your Head on My Shoulder". Lyrics by Harold Adamson. From the 1934 film Kid Millions.
- "Swing High, Swing Low". Lyrics by Ralph Freed. From the 1937 film of the same name.
- "Says My Heart". Lyrics by Frank Loesser. From the 1938 film Cocoanut Grove.
- "Moments Like This". Lyrics by Frank Loesser. From the 1938 film College Swing.
- "The Lady's in Love with You". Lyrics by Frank Loesser. From the 1939 film Some Like It Hot.
- "I Hear Music". Lyrics by Frank Loesser. From the 1940 film Dancing on a Dime.
- "How About You?". Lyrics by Ralph Freed. From the 1941 film Babes on Broadway. Nominated for an Academy Award for Best Original Song.
- "Feudin' and Fightin'". Lyrics by Burton Lane and Frank Loesser. From the 1944 revue Laffing Room Only.
- "How Are Things in Glocca Morra?", "Old Devil Moon" and "If This Isn't Love". Lyrics by Yip Harburg. From the 1947 musical Finian's Rainbow.
- "Too Late Now". Lyrics by Alan Jay Lerner. From the 1951 film Royal Wedding. Nominated for an Academy Award for Best Original Song.
- "On a Clear Day (You Can See Forever)" and "Come Back to Me". Lyrics by Alan Jay Lerner. From the 1965 musical On a Clear Day You Can See Forever.

See also Songs with music by Burton Lane.

== Discography ==
=== Stage shows and films ===
- Fred Astaire, Jane Powell (1951). Royal Wedding (LP). US: MGM Records. E-543.
- Original Broadway cast (1960). Finian's Rainbow (LP). US: RCA Victor. LSO-1057.
- Original Broadway cast (1965). On a Clear Day You Can See Forever (LP). US: RCA Victor. LSOD-2006.
- Fred Astaire, Petula Clark et al. (1968). Finian's Rainbow: The Original Motion Picture Soundtrack (LP). US: Warner Bros. BS 2550.
- Barbra Streisand, Yves Montand et al. (1970). On a Clear Day You Can See Forever (LP). US: CBS. 70075.
- Original Broadway cast (1980). Finian's Rainbow (CD). US: Sony Classical. SK 89208. This is a reissue of the 1947 original cast recording on 78 RPM shellac.
- Original Broadway cast (1980). Carmelina (LP). US: Original Cast Records. OC 8019.
- Studio cast (1990). Hold On to Your Hats (CD). US: Painted Smiles Records. PSCD-120.
- Irish Repertory Theatre (2004). Finian's Rainbow (CD). US: Ghostlight Records. 4402-2.
- 2009 Broadway revival cast (2009). Finian's Rainbow (CD). US: PS Classics. PS 1088.

=== Songs ===
- Maxine Sullivan with The Keith Ingram Sextet (1985). The Lady's In Love With You (Maxine Sullivan Sings The Music Of Burton Lane) (LP). US: Stash Records. ST-257.
- Michael Feinstein, Burton Lane (1990). Michael Feinstein Sings the Burton Lane Songbook, Vol. 1 (CD). US: Elektra Nonesuch. 9 79243-2.
- Michael Feinstein, Burton Lane (1992). Michael Feinstein Sings the Burton Lane Songbook, Vol. 2 (CD). US: Elektra Nonesuch. 9 79285-2.
- Kate Baldwin (2009). Let's See What Happens: Songs Of Lane & Harburg (CD). US: PS Classics. PS-986.

== Sources ==
- Attie, Paulette (March 23, 1966). "Musical Playbill: Burton Lane". wnyc.org. The NYPR Archive Collections. Audio interview with Lane on diverse topics. Includes sung and played performance of "On a Clear Day".
- Bloom, Ken (1995a). Hollywood Song: The Complete Film & Musical Companion. Vol. 1. New York, NY: Facts on File. ISBN 0-8160-2668-8.
- Bloom, Ken (1995b). Hollywood Song: The Complete Film & Musical Companion. Vol. 2. New York, NY: Facts on File. ISBN 0-8160-2667-X.
- Bloom, Ken (1995c). Hollywood Song: The Complete Film & Musical Companion. Vol. 3. New York, NY: Facts on File. ISBN 0-8160-3231-9.
- Bloom, Ken (1996a). American Song: The Complete Musical Theatre Companion. Vol. 1 (2nd ed.). New York: Schirmer Books. ISBN 0-02-864573-1.
- Bloom, Ken (1996b). American Song: The Complete Musical Theatre Companion. Vol. 2 (2nd ed.). New York: Schirmer Books. ISBN 0-02-864572-3.
- Ewen, David (1987). American Songwriters. New York: H.W. Wilson. pp. 253–256. ISBN 0-8242-0744-0.
- Hischak, Thomas (1995). The American Musical Theatre Song Encyclopedia. Westport, Conn.: Greenwood Press. ISBN 0-313-29407-0.
- Hischak, Thomas (1999). The American Musical Film Song Encyclopedia. Westport, Conn.: Greenwood Press. ISBN 0-313-30737-7.
- Loesser, Susan (1993). A Most Remarkable Fella. New York: D.I. Fine. ISBN 1556113641.
- Meyerson, Harold; Harburg, Ernie (1993). Who Put the Rainbow in the Wizard of Oz?. Ann Arbor, Michigan: University of Michigan Press. ISBN 0-472-10482-9.
- Segal, Vivian W. (1994). "Burton Lane Oral History Memoir". New York Public Library Digital Collections. William E. Wiener Oral History Library of the American Jewish Committee at New York Public Library.
- Segrave, Kerry (1994). Payola in the Music Industry: A History, 1880-1991. Jefferson, NC: McFarland. ISBN 0-89950-882-0.
- Shipman, David (1992). Judy Garland: The Secret Life of an American Legend. New York: Hyperion. ISBN 1-56282-846-0.
- Suskin, Steven (2010). Show Tunes: The Songs, Shows, and Careers of Broadway's Major Composers (4th ed.). New York: Oxford University Press. pp. 163–167. ISBN 978-0-19-531407-6.
- Wilder, Alec (1990). American Popular Song: The Great Innovators, 1900-1950. New York: Oxford University Press. pp. 331–343. ISBN 978-0195014457.
- Winer, Deborah Grace (1997). On the Sunny Side of the Street. New York, NY: Schirmer Books. ISBN 0-02-864730-0.
- Wolinsky, Richard (August 17, 1992). "The Gershwin Project V: Burton Lane". KPFA.
