= Leslie Ann Jones =

American recording engineer

- Leslie Ann Jones at work mixing
- Born: United States
- Occupations: Recording engineer, record producer
- Parent(s): Spike Jones, Helen Grayco

Leslie Ann Jones is an American multiple Grammy Award-winning recording engineer, working as Director of Music Recording and Scoring at Skywalker Sound, a Lucasfilm, Ltd. company. She is a past Chair of the National Academy of Recording Arts and Sciences Board of Trustees, the organization that awards Grammys, and in 2018 was inducted into the TEC Awards Hall of Fame. She is the daughter of novelty drummer, percussionist and bandleader Spike Jones and his wife, singer Helen Grayco.

== Early influences ==
Jones has had an interest in music since her early childhood in the Los Angeles, California-area TV and music scene. Through her father she was exposed to a wide variety of musical styles. Through her mother, Helen Grayco (who sang with her father's band), she grew to appreciate fine vocalists such as Mel Tormé, Frank Sinatra and Barbra Streisand. She was given a Sears Silvertone electric guitar and played in a band beginning when she was fourteen. She played Top 40 hits on guitar and sang background vocals with an all-female band; she arranged music for other people's bands and assembled a PA system. In 1974, she served as road manager and live sound mixer for Fanny on their world tour. Jones also made basement recordings for bands on an early Tascam ½" 4-track tape machine. She wanted to be another Peter Asher and produce bands. Her favorite music is big band.

== Recording career ==
Jones's first engineering job was at ABC Studios working as a production engineer, making copies of recordings. She worked as an assistant engineer for several years, training with Roy Halee, Reggie Dozier and Barney Perkins until being asked by John Mayall to lead the engineering of his live concert album Lots of People in 1977.

In 1978, Jones moved north to San Francisco, California to work at The Automatt, a recording studio known for cutting-edge developments such as automation in mixing, an innovation followed quickly by the purchase of one of the earliest digital audio recording systems. She recorded many cues for the Apocalypse Now soundtrack and recordings by Herbie Hancock and Carlos Santana. She trained with engineer Fred Catero and producer David Rubinson. She also recorded albums by Maze, Confunkshun, Holly Near, and Angela Bofill.

The Automatt closed in 1984 and Jones became a freelance engineer for three years. She engineered sessions for Windham Hill Records as well as for Olivia Records in their last few years of operation.

In 1987, she moved back to Los Angeles to work at Capitol Studios. That position lasted for ten years, during which time she furthered her reputation by engineering prominent jazz, vocal and classical recordings such as Rosemary Clooney, Michael Feinstein, and continued recording film and TV scores.

In 1997, she began working with Skywalker Sound, where she continues to the present as Director of Music Recording and Scoring; she keeps busy recording orchestral scores, mixing film and video elements and recording and producing music albums. She enjoys playing on one of the intramural Skywalker softball teams.

== Promoting women ==
As a woman working in a field long dominated by men, Jones has participated in many 'firsts'. She was the first woman assistant engineer to be hired at ABC Studios in Los Angeles in 1975. She was the first female National Officer of the National Academy of Recording Arts and Sciences.

Jones is on the advisory board of Women's Audio Mission. WAM is a non-profit, women-run organization dedicated to the advancement of women in the recording arts. She also serves on the Recording Arts Advisory Board of Expression College of Digital Arts, serves as a Trustee for the San Francisco Chapter of The Recording Academy, is on the Board of Music in Schools today, and is an advisor on guest instructor for recording at Institute for the Musical Arts in Goshen, Massachusetts.

In 2001, Jones was invited to take part in Women in NASA's 6th Annual Virtual Take Our Daughters To Work Day, sponsored by Ms. Foundation for Women.

Jones has produced a number of recordings that feature women musicians, from small regional groups like Montclair Women's Big Band to major artists associated with feminism, activism or women's music such as Holly Near, Cris Williamson, Margie Adam and Ronnie Gilbert. Jones co-produced one of Jane Fonda's follow-up workout videos in 1984 and she received a platinum record for the album of the same name.

== Awards ==
In 2018, Jones was inaugurated in the TEC Awards’ Hall of Fame as part of the NAMM Show.

Grammy Awards & Nominations
Year	Category	Title	Note
2003	Best Engineered Album, Classical	Bach: The Piano Transcriptions Of Bartók, Lipatti & Friedman	Nomination
2003	Best Chamber Music Performance	Berg: Lyric Suite	Win
2005	Best Jazz Vocal Album	Good Night, And Good Luck.	Win
2006	Best Engineered Album, Classical	Látigo	Nomination
2010	Best Engineered Album, Classical	Porter, Quincy: Complete Viola Works	Win
2013	Best Surround Sound Album	Signature Sound Opus One	Nomination
2013	Best Engineered Album, Classical	The Blue Room	Nomination
2015	Best Engineered Album, Classical	Ask Your Mama	Win
2019	Best Engineered Album, Classical	Sun Rings, Kronos Quartet	Win
2021	Best Immersive Audio Album	Soundtrack of the American Soldier	Win
2022	Best Engineered Album, Classical	Chanticleer Sings Christmas	Win

== Credits ==
=== Music albums ===
- Margie Adam Another Place (1993)
- Alice in Chains Facelift (1990), Columbia
- David Axelrod Requiem: The Holocaust (1993)
- Richard Barone Glow (2010), Bar/None
- David Benoit Urban Daydreams (1988)
- Angela Bofill Something About You, Too Tough, Arista
- Debby Boone Reflections of Rosemary (2005)
- Dee Dee Bridgewater Dear Ella (Grammy Award 1997), Verve
- Kim Carnes Checkin' Out the Ghosts (1991), Teichiku
- William Edward "Billy" Childs Take For Example This (1988), Twilight Is Upon Us (1989), Windham Hill Jazz
- Meg Christian From The Heart (1985)
- Clayton-Hamilton Jazz Orchestra Absolutely! (1995), Independent
- Rosemary Clooney The Last Concert, (Grammy nominated 2002), Sentimental Journey: The Girl Singer and Her New Big Band, (Grammy nominated 2001), Brazil (2000), Mothers and Daughters (#1 Jazz Record), The Concord Jazz Heritage Series, White Christmas (#1 Jazz record 1996), Dedicated to Nelson (Grammy nominated 1996), Out Of This World (2002), Concord Jazz
- Con Funk Shun Con Funk Shun 7 (1981), Mercury
- Miles Davis and Quincy Jones Miles & Quincy Live at Montreux (1991)
- Alix Dobkin Love & Politics: A 30 Year Saga (1992)
- Kyle Eastwood From There to Here (1998), Sony
- Dave Edmunds Closer to the Flame (1990), Capitol
- Dave Eshelman Milagro's Journey (2001)
- Michael Feinstein Nice Work If You Can Get It: Songs by the Gershwins (1996), Michael & George: Feinstein Sings Gershwin (#1 Jazz Record, 1998), Big City Rhythms (1999), Romance on Film, Romance on Broadway (2000), Michael Feinstein with the Israel Philharmonic Orchestra (Grammy nominated, 2001), Anthology (2002)
- Ferron Shadows On A Dime (1984)
- Maynard Ferguson On a High Note: The Best of the Concord Jazz Recordings (2007)
- Tret Fure Terminal Hold/Edges of the Heart (1999)
- Charlie Haden Always Say Goodbye (Verve, 1994)
- Herbie Hancock Lite Me Up (1982), Mr. Hands, Monster, The Herbie Hancock Box (2002), CBS
- Sam Harris Different Stages (1994), Standard Time (1994)
- Howard Hewett It's Time (1994)
- Miki Howard Miki Sings Billie: A Tribute to Billie Holiday (1993)
- B. B. King & Diane Schuur Heart to Heart (2004), GRP
- Kitka The Vine (2002), Diaphonica, Wintersongs (2003)
- Kronos Quartet (2003 Grammy Award, Berg: Lyric Suite Best Chamber Music Performance) and Terry Riley: Requiem for Adam (2001), Nuevo (2002), U.S. Highball (2003), Fourth String Quartet (2003), Caravan Nonesuch Records
- Petronel Malan Transfigured Bach: The Piano Transcriptions Of Bartók, Lipatti & Friedman (2004 Grammy nominated: Best Engineered Album, Classical), Hänssler Classic
- The Manhattan Transfer The Offbeat of Avenues (1991)
- John Mayall Lots of People (1977), Hard Core Package/The Last Of The British Blues (2000)
- Maze We Are One (1983), Can't Stop the Love (1985), Capitol
- Bobby McFerrin Bobby McFerrin (1982) Elektra/Musician, Spontaneous Inventions (1985), EMI
- Maureen McGovern The Music Never Ends (1997) and (2003 reissue)
- Carmen McRae Carmen Sings Monk, RCA
- Carmen McRae and Betty Carter The Carmen McRae-Betty Carter Duets (1987), GAMH/Fantasy
- Meat Puppets Forbidden Places (1991)
- Alyssa Milano Look in My Heart (1989)
- Marcus Miller Marcus Miller (1984), The Sun Don't Lie (1993)
- Jessica Molaskey Pentimento (2002)
- Najee Just An Illusion (1992)
- Andy Narell Slow Motion (1985)
- Holly Near Crushed! The Love Song Collection, And Still We Sing: The Outspoken Collection (2002), 'Speed of Light", Fire In The Rain", "Watch Out"
- Holly Near and Ronnie Gilbert Lifeline (2002)
- Holly Near, Arlo Guthrie, Ronnie Gilbert, Pete Seeger H.A.R.P – A Time To Sing (2001)
- Rosie O'Donnell A Rosie Christmas (1999)
- Awadagin Pratt and St. Lawrence Quartet Play Bach (2002), Angel
- Quartet San Francisco Latigo (Grammy nominated, 2006), Whirled Chamber Music (2007), ViolinJazz Recordings
- Dianne Reeves (2005 Grammy Award, Good Night, and Good Luck Best Jazz Vocal Album)
- Rhiannon In My Prime (2005)
- Romanovsky and Phillips Trouble in Paradise (1986), Let's Flaunt It! (1995)
- Lara St. John Bach: 6 Sonatas and Partitas (2002), Ancalagon Records
- San Francisco Camerata Corpus Evita, an Opera in 2 Acts (Grammy nominated 2005), SFC
- San Francisco Girls Chorus Voices of Hope and Peace (2006), SFGC
- The San José Chamber Orchestra Choose Life, Uvacharta Bachayim (2011), SJCO
- Carlos Santana The Swing of Delight (1980), CBS
- Gustavo Santaolalla 21 Grams (2003)
- SF Jazz Collective 2 (2006)
- Michelle Shocked Children's Album, Earthbeat, Short Sharp Shocked [expanded] (2003)
- Wayne Shorter High Life (Grammy award 1996), Verve
- Special Generation Take It To The Floor (1990)
- Narada Michael Walden Confidence, Atlantic
- The Whispers Love For Love (1983), Solar
- Cris Williamson Blue Rider (1982), Fringe (2007), "Strange Paradise"
- BeBe & CeCe Winans Different Lifestyles (1991), Capitol
- various artists Concord Records 30th Anniversary (2003)
- various artists Deadicated: A Tribute to the Grateful Dead (1991)
- various artists Sedated in the Eighties, Vol. 4 (1995)
- various artists 'S Wonderful: Concord Jazz Salutes Ira Gershwin (1979)
- various artists Climb Against the Odds (1999)
- various artists Where Have All The Flowers Gone: The Songs Of Pete Seeger (Vol. 1) (1998)
- various artists The Gift (1999), Maranatha
- various artists Hillbilly Music: Thank God!, Vol. 1 (1989)
- various artists Concord Records SACD Sampler, Vol. 1 (2003)
- various artists The Butterfly Tree (2003), Summit
- various artists Music From And Inspired By The Motion Picture Dead Man Walking (Original Soundtrack, 1996)

=== Film sound ===
- Apocalypse Now (1977–78)
- Mad Dog Time (1996)
- The House of Yes (1997)
- Apocalypse Now Redux (2001)
- This World, Then the Fireworks (1997)
- Requiem for a Dream (2000)
- Let Go (2003)
- The Company (2003)
- Ballets Russes (2005)
- Happy Feet (2006)
- Zodiac (2007)

=== TV shows ===
- Three Women and a Chateau, PBS
- Boffo! Tinseltown's Bombs and Blockbusters, HBO
- Soldiers of Conscience, PBS
- The Grammy Awards, CBS TV
- In A Child's Name, CBS TV
- Homefront, CBS TV
- Climb Against the Odds, PBS
- If These Walls Could Talk (1996), HBO
- See Jane Run, CBS TV

=== 5.1 DVD concert sound ===
- Nellie McKay Get Away from Me 5.1 DVD Sony/MX Entertainment
- Herbie Hancock Future 2 Future, 5.1 DVD, MX Extertainment

=== Video game scores ===
- Clive Barker's Jericho (2007)
- Haze (2008)
- Beowulf: The Game (2007)
- Star Wars: The Force Unleashed (2008)
- G.I. Joe: The Rise of Cobra
- Gears of War 2
- Prototype
- Dead Space
