= Driver (Ferron album) =

Studio album by Ferron
- Released: 1994
- Studio: Desolation Sound, Maddock Studios
- Genre: Folk rock
- Label: Cherrywood Station, Earthbeat!
- Producer: Don "DB" Benedictson

Ferron chronology
Not a Still Life (1992)	Driver (1994)	Still Riot (1996)

Driver is a folk-rock album by the Canadian singer-songwriter Ferron. It was originally released in 1994 on her own Cherrywood Station label, and distributed by Earthbeat!, a division of Warner Brothers. Stephen Holden of The New York Times named it one of the top 10 albums of 1994: "These expansive confessional road songs by the husky-voiced Canadian singer and songwriter communicate a lifetime's wisdom with a bone-deep honesty."

According to Ferron, the album was "the completion of an intention to create a whole body of work."

== Production ==
The songs on the album were informed by the positive feelings generated by Ferron's relationship and family, which by 1994 included a baby daughter named Maya. Relegated to a drawer marked "g" for "garbage," Ferron considered the songs too personal to record until she auditioned them for guitarist Shelly Jennings. Some of the album was recorded Ferron's garage on Vashon Island, using portable equipment.

"It's very peaceful," Ferron told The Province. "But not sleepy. I went through a lot of emotion putting that record out." "There's supposed to be a question mark at the end of the title, but everyone thought it looked stupid," she told The Vancouver Sun. "But I think the question mark is important—because who ever really knows? It may feel like driving, but we all take wrong turns, we all screw up all the time, but we all keep going."

The song "Maya" was inspired by a dream about Joni Mitchell. "Borderlines" had previously appeared on Ferron's 1977 debut album.

"Girl on a Road" has become one of her signature songs. According to a 2017 interview, only one line of the song is strictly autobiographical: "My momma was a waitress, my daddy was a truck driver/ the things that kept their power from them slowed me down a while." The song was written quickly, in Chicago, while waiting for a sound check. She cried while writing it. When recording the song for the album, she asked the musicians to refrain from distracting flourishes in order to maintain focus on the core message. The song also inspired the title of a 2009 documentary about the musician by filmmaker Gerry Rogers.

== Critical reception ==
Professional ratings
Review scores
Source	Rating
New York Times	Favorable
The Advocate	Favorable
Philadelphia Daily News	3.5/4 stars
Washington Post	Favorable

"...an expansive sigh of joy from this nomadic folkie who has finally found her mate and settled into a rustic idyll in the Pacific Northwest," said The New York Times. "The songs, the best of which recall the dreamy mood of Van Morrison's most enraptured reveries, take stock of life and love in language and music that is startlingly intimate, honest and inspiring."

The Philadelphia Daily News called Driver "an arty gem," singling out "Girl on a Road," "Independence Day" and "Maya" as favorites.

Geoffrey Himes in The Washington Post considered Driver a return to form, appreciating the "chamber-folk" arrangements and the work of producer Don Benedictson. "Ferron is less interested in pat platitudes than in life's most elusive riddles," said Himes. "She pursues them with the tenacity of her fellow Canadians, Joni Mitchell and Neil Young."

"A richly produced, moody meditation on turning 40, accepting aloneness, and learning how to love," according to The Advocate.

== Track listing ==
All songs written by Ferron

1. "Breakpoint"
2. "Girl on a Road"
3. "Call Me"
4. "Cactus"
5. "Love Loves Me"
6. "Borderlines"
7. "Sunshine's Lament (Prologue)"
8. "Sunshine"
9. "Sunshine's Lament (Epilogue)"
10. "Independence Day
11. "A Name for It"
12. "Maya"

== Personnel ==
=== Musicians ===
- Ferron – acoustic guitar, lead vocals
- Shelly Jennings – acoustic guitar, electric guitar, synthesizer
- Craig Kaleal – drums
- Adrienne Torf – piano, synthesizer pads
- Calvin Cairns – accordion, violin
- Chris Webster – background vocals
- Darryl Havers – clavinet, melodica, Hammond organ, piano, synthesizer
- Don "DB" Benedictson – fretless bass, background vocals
- John Hudson – log drums
- Steve Hilliam – soprano saxophone
- Larry Tuttle – chapman stick (tracks: 2, 9)
- Denny Fongheiser – drums, percussion
- Jim Lang – keyboards
- Steve Reid – percussion
- Novi Novog – viola

=== Technical ===
- Don "DB" Benedictson – producer, engineer
- Craig Arnatt – engineer
- Sheldon Zaharko – mixing
- Paul Stubblebine – mastering
