= Earl MacDonald =

Earl Murray MacDonald
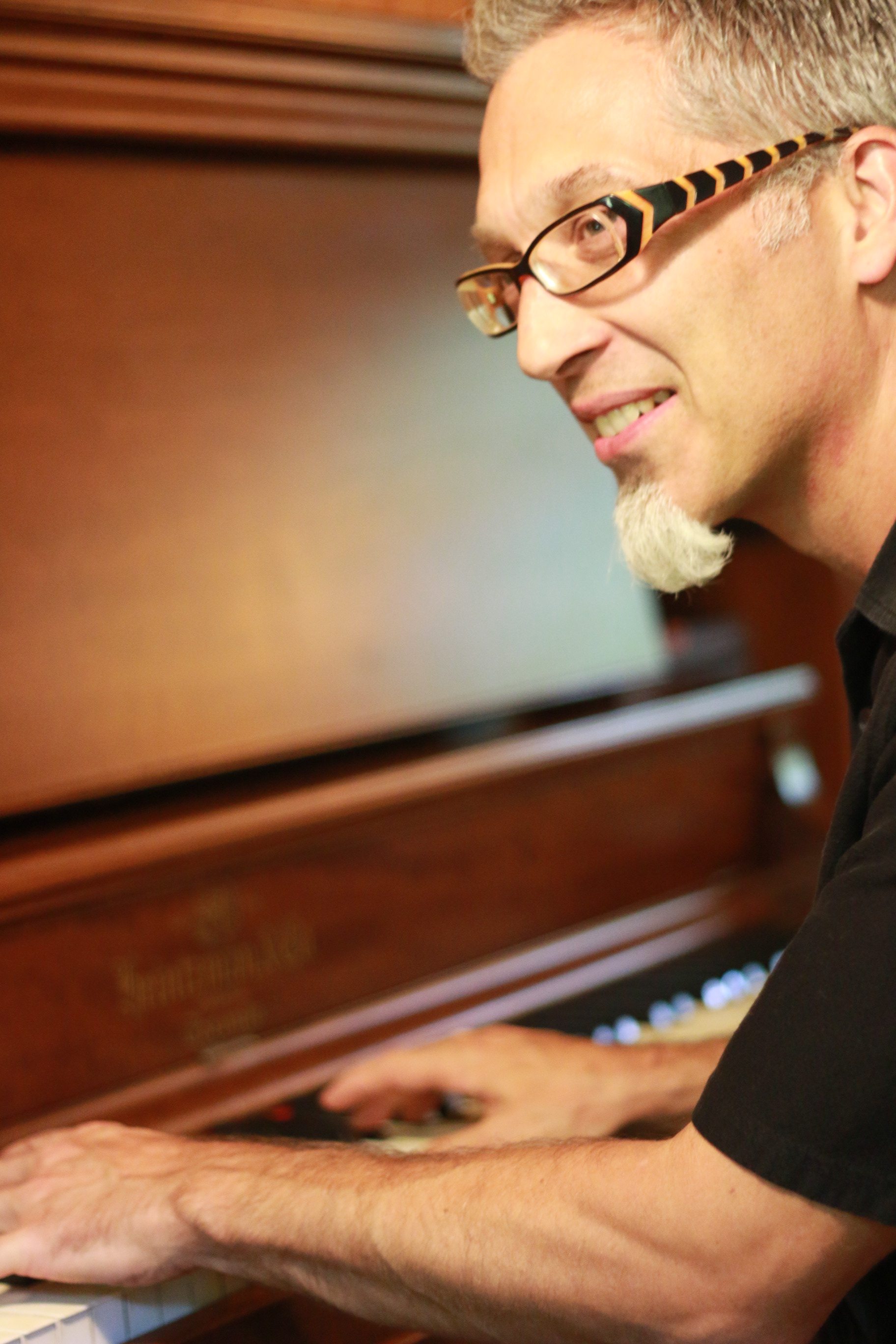

Background information
- Born: July 26, 1970 (age 56); Winnipeg, Manitoba, Canada
- Genres: Jazz, bebop, hard bop, post-bop, modal jazz, big band, classical, orchestral jazz
- Occupations: Composer, arranger, conductor, musician, university professor
- Instrument: Piano
- Years active: 1995–present
- Labels: Death Defying Records, Sea Breeze Jazz
- Website: earlmacdonald.com

Earl MacDonald (born July 26, 1970) is a Canadian jazz composer, pianist, arranger, conductor, and educator. MacDonald's compositional work frequently draws upon other musical styles, fusing them with jazz. The Winnipeg native has been employed as director of jazz studies at the University of Connecticut since the fall of 2000.

== Early years ==
MacDonald was born and raised in Winnipeg, Manitoba, Canada. His father, Keith MacDonald, was a bagpiper who authored "The Church Piper" book series.

MacDonald began taking music lessons at age five, starting on electronic organ. As a teenager he earned money playing the organ for Winnipeg Jets hockey games (1985–1988). He attended Silver Heights Collegiate Institute, where his high school stage band was nationally recognized, winning "Most Outstanding" and Gold awards at the 1988 MusicFest Canada competition.

== Education and career ==
MacDonald received his bachelor of music in 1992 from McGill University of Montreal, Canada, where he majored in jazz performance. His jazz piano teachers included Fred Henke, Luc Beaugrand and André White. He studied arranging with Christopher Smith, composition with Jan Jarczyk, and improvisation with trumpeter Kevin Dean.

MacDonald's graduate studies spanned 1993 to 1995 at Rutgers University in New Brunswick, New Jersey. He apprenticed with Kenny Barron who recorded MacDonald's composition, "Wanton Spirit" while he was still a graduate student. The song was released as the title track of Barron's Grammy-nominated CD with Roy Haynes and Charlie Haden. At Rutgers, MacDonald studied arranging with Michael Philip Mossman and played in ensembles under the direction of Ralph Bowen.

MacDonald has participated in the BMI Jazz Composers' Workshop under the direction of Jim McNeely, Michael Abene and Mike Holober. He also attended the Summer Jazz Workshop in Banff, Canada in 2001, and has audited conducting courses at UConn with Dr. Jeffrey Renshaw.

=== Maynard Ferguson and Big Bop Nouveau ===
MacDonald joined Maynard Ferguson's touring band in 1998, following a one-year teaching appointment at Bowling Green State University. He worked with Ferguson for two years, performing across North America, Europe and Asia. One studio album was recorded during MacDonald's tenure with Ferguson: "Big City Rhythms", a collaboration with singer Michael Feinstein. Video recordings of several concerts have been publicly released, including MacDonald's second performance with the band, which was released on DVD as "Maynard Ferguson - Live from the King Cat Theatre" (in Seattle, WA).

=== Teaching ===
MacDonald taught at St. Francis Xavier University from 1996 to 1997 and at Bowling Green State University from 1997 to 1998, before joining the University of Connecticut faculty in 2000 as Director of Jazz Studies. He was promoted to full professor in 2016.

At UConn he teaches courses on improvisation and arranging, while also directing student ensembles and administering the jazz program. MacDonald frequently participates as a clinician, guest conductor and teacher at summer camps. In recent years he has taught at the Kincardine Summer Music Festival, Jazz In July at UMASS Amherst and Marshall University's "Jazz-MU-Tazz" camp in West Virginia.

== Awards, nominations and recognition ==
=== Professional ===
- 2003: Sammy Nestico Award, for outstanding big band arrangement, sponsored by the USAF
- 2003: Artist Fellowship, Connecticut Commission on the Arts
- 2004: Best Jazz Group, Hartford Advocate's Reader's Poll (the Earl MacDonald 6)
- 2003: Parent's Choice Award for "Treblemakers Jazz It Up" CD.
- 2007: Finalist, Charlie Parker/BMI Jazz Composition Award
- 2008: Finalist, ArtEZ Jazz Composition Contest, the Netherlands
- 2009: Artist Fellowship, Connecticut Commission on Culture and Tourism
- 2011: JUNO award nomination for Traditional Jazz Album of the Year
- 2011: 10th Annual Independent Music Awards, winner, jazz song category
- 2011: Best Jazz Group, Hartford Advocate readers' poll (New Directions Ensemble)
- 2011: Finalist, ArtEZ Jazz Composition Contest, the Netherlands
- 2014: JUNO award nomination for Contemporary Jazz Album of the Year

=== Academic ===
- 2003: AAUP Excellence Award for Teaching Promise
- 2004: New Scholar Award, School of Fine Arts, University of Connecticut
- 2006: AAUP Excellence Award for Teaching Innovation
- 2011: UConn School of Fine Arts Special Achievement Award
- 2013: UConn School of Fine Arts Outstanding Faculty Award

== Musical ensembles ==
=== Jazz Orchestra (Big Band) ===
MacDonald has released two albums of his compositions and arrangements for 17-piece jazz orchestra (big band): "UConn Jazz" (2002) and "Re:Visions - Works for Jazz Orchestra" (2010). The latter received a Juno Award nomination for traditional jazz album of the year in 2011. Reviewer, Dan Bilawsky asserted, "Re:Visions goes beyond where most big bands go and the music here establishes Earl MacDonald as a major force in the world of jazz composition."

MacDonald's big band arrangements are published through eJazz Lines.

=== C.O.W. (Creative Opportunity Workshop) ===
In 2013 MacDonald released an album with the unorthodox instrumentation of cello, saxophone, percussion and piano. MacDonald said, "This band, the Creative Opportunity Workshop, was formed to serve as a personal playground for experimentation and fusions." The CD, "Mirror of the Mind" received a JUNO award nomination for contemporary jazz album of the year and garnered many favorable reviews.

=== New Directions Ensemble ===
MacDonald currently serves as musical director and composer-in-residence for the Hartford Jazz Society's New Directions Ensemble. The group's instrumentation consists of 2 trumpets, 1 trombone, 1 French horn, 3 saxophones (1 alto, 1 tenor, 1 bari), piano, bass and drums. Owen McNally of the Hartford Courant described the band and outlined its mission, stating "the fresh-sounding New Directions Ensemble taps into the rich lode of area talent, provides a vital forum for original compositions, spreads the good word about contemporary band music in its educational role, and provides a prominent public face for its sponsor, the Hartford Jazz Society. The New Directions Ensemble is set to swing in its own fresh way, generating contemporary band music that lives in the present, independent, cliché-free and untethered to conventional big band nostalgia."

== Discography ==
=== As leader ===
Recording date	Title	Label	Year released	Notes
1996–06	Schroeder's Tantrum	Radioland Jazz	1997	
2002–04	UConn Jazz	SeaBreeze Vista	2002	
2004–01	The Earl MacDonald 6	SeaBreeze	2005	
2008–11	re:Visions	Death Defying	2010	
2012–11	Mirror of the Mind	Death Defying	2013	
2015–11	Open Borders	Death Defying	2017	
2020–02	Consecrated	Outside in Music	2021	

=== Collaborations ===
Year released	Primary artist(s)	Title	Label	Role	Notes / Certifications
1994	Kenny Barron	Wanton Spirit	Verve	Composer of title track	Grammy-nominated for Best Jazz Instrumental Performance
1998	Jim Brenan	Jim Brenan	self-released	Arranger	
1999	Michael Feinstein with the Maynard Ferguson Big Band	Big City Rhythms	Concord	piano	
2004	Treblemakers Children's Choir, directed by Dr. Mary Ellen Junda	Treblemakers Jazz It Up!	self-released	Arranger, piano	Parents' Choice Award
2004	Maynard Ferguson, Big Bop Nouveau	Live From the King Cat Theatre in Seattle	Paradise Media Partners	Piano	[DVD-Video] Live
2007	Tom Thorndike	Tom Thorndike Trio	Hip Shades	Producer	
2018	Winnipeg Jazz Orchestra	Suite 150 - A Big Band Portrait	self-released	Composer, arranger	
2022	Sean Nelson's New London Big Band	Social Hour!	MAMA	Composer, arranger, pianist	
2024	Brenan Brothers	Valley of Silence	Death Defying	Arranger, pianist	
2025	Sean Nelson's New London Big Band featuring Wayne Bergeron and John Riley	Don't Stop Now: The Lost Music of Thad Jones Written for Harry James	self-released	Co-producer	

== Personal life ==
Currently, MacDonald lives in Mansfield, CT with his wife, Jana (née Smith). The couple were married in 2003 in South Windsor, CT. Together they have two children.
