= Shadows on a Dime =

1984 studio album

Studio album by Ferron
- Released: 1984
- Studio: Pinewood Studios, Vancouver; The Automatt, San Francisco; Harbour Sound, Sausalito, California
- Genre: Folk rock
- Length: 42:42
- Label: Lucy Records, Redwood Records, Cherrywood Station
- Producer: Terry Garthwaite, Gayle Scott (exec)

Ferron chronology
Testimony (1980)	Shadows on a Dime (1984)	Phantom Center (1990)

Shadows on a Dime is a folk-rock album by the Canadian singer-songwriter Ferron. It was originally released in 1984 on the independent label Lucy Records; subsequently it has been re-released on LP, CD and cassette by Redwood Records and Cherrywood Station.

== Critical reception ==
Professional ratings
Review scores
Source	Rating
Robert Christgau	A−
AllMusic	Favorable
Rolling Stone	4/5 stars
Washington Post	Favorable

Don Shewey in Rolling Stone called the album "a feast of excellent musicianship and fine songwriting" and "a thing of beauty" and says of the production, "The album's many moods are superbly reflected in Terry Garthwaite's production, and ideal instrumental touches keep the more contemplative songs from sounding drab".

The Washington Post published a good review which compares the album favourably with other albums released by other artists associated with the "Women's music" genre at the time, including Barbara Higbie and Teresa Trull who appear on this album: "With her haunting folk drone, her jabbing gypsy guitars and fiddles, her torrents of metaphors (and her descriptions of lesbian relationships), she challenges the field as it's never been challenged before. She is the first major artist to emerge from its ranks," wrote Geoffrey Himes. The album "fulfills the potential hinted at on 1980's 'Testimony'", he writes. Regarding how her songs address friends facing difficulties in relationships he writes, "With a courage too rare in pop music, Ferron doesn't offer her friends easy solutions for their problems, but forces them to face up to difficult reality".

== Track listing ==
All songs written by Ferron. The tracks on the CD are in the same order as on the LP.

=== Side one: Dreaming Back ===
1. "Knot 53"
2. "Snowin' in Brooklyn"
3. "As Soon as I Find My Shoes I'm Gone"
4. "Proud Crowd / Pride Cried"
5. "I Never Was to Africa"

=== Side two: The Return ===
1. "Shadows on a Dime"
2. "Circle Round" (instrumental)
3. "The Return"
4. "It Won't Take Long"

== Personnel ==
=== Musicians ===
- Ferron – vocals (all except B2), acoustic guitar (all except A3, B4)
- Barbara Borden – drums (B3)
- Jeanne Bradshaw – support vocals (B4)
- John Clavin – support vocals (B4)
- Linda Domingo – support vocals (B4)
- Mary Fettig – tenor saxophone (A1), alto flute (A5)
- Roy "Bim" Forbes – harmony vocals (A4)
- Terry Garthwaite – support vocals (B4)
- Nina Gerber – harmonica (A2), mandolin (B3)
- Joe Goldmark – pedal steel (B3)
- Glen Hendrickson – drums (A1-4, B1)
- Barbara Higbie – fiddle (B1, B3), Support vocal (B3)
- Michael Lent – bass (A1), fretless bass (A2, A5, B1)
- Diane Lindsay – electric bass (B3)
- Dawne Milligan – lute and second viola parts arrangement (B2)
- Brian Newcombe – bass (A3, A4)
- Novi Novog – electric viola (B2, B4), synthesiser (B4)
- Dave Pickell – piano, synthesiser (A4)
- Vicki Randle – congas (B4)
- Brent Shindell – acoustic guitar (A2, B1)
- Tony Simmonds – lute (B2)
- Lucinda Smith – support vocals (B4)
- Adrienne Torf – synthesiser (A1), electric piano (A2, B3)
- Teresa Trull – support vocal (B3)
- Marc vanWageningen – bass (B4)
- Paul vanWageningen – drums (B4)
- Brett Wade – electric guitar (A1-5)
- Willow Wray – support vocals (B4)

=== Others ===
- Terry Garthwaite – production
- Leslie Ann Jones – engineering, mixing
- Gayle Scott – executive producer, art direction, photography
- Barbara Hodgson – album design
- John Clavin – assistant engineer
- Ray Pyle – assistant engineer
- Paul Stubblebine (at The Automat) – mastering
