= Phantom Center =

Studio album by Ferron
- Released: 1990, 1995
- Studio: Eldorado Recording Studios, Los Angeles; Knob World Studios, Los Angeles; Purple Dragon Studios, Atlanta; Summa Music Group, Los Angeles
- Genre: Folk rock
- Length: 49:53
- Label: Chameleon Records, EarthBeat! Records
- Producer: Joe Chiccarelli, Ferron

Ferron chronology
Shadows on a Dime (1984)	Phantom Center (1990)	Resting With the Question (1992)

Phantom Center is a 1990 studio album by the Canadian female singer-songwriter Ferron.

== Background and release ==
It was Ferron's first album in six years. It was later re-packaged and re-released by Warner Bros. Music in 1995.

== Critical reception ==
Robert Christgau rated this album "neither", meaning "may impress once or twice with consistent craft or an arresting track or two. Then it won't".

Stephen Holden in the New York Times called the album 'captivating', noting "its quirky, archetypal imagery, and diction that swings between the conversational and the oracular". Steven Hochman of the Los Angeles Times wrote that the album "made modern self-analysis seem easy, and even fun."

== Track listing ==
All songs written by Ferron.

1. "Stand Up (Love in the Corners)"
2. "The Cart"
3. "Harmless Love"
4. "Indian Dreams"
5. "Sunken City"
6. "White Wing Mercy"
7. "Heart of Destruction"
8. "Inside Track" (also known as "My My (Inside Track)")
9. "Phantom Center"
10. "Higher Wisdom"

== Personnel ==
Adapted from liner notes

=== Musicians ===
- Ferron - lead vocals, acoustic guitar
- Denny Fongheiser - drums, percussion
- Tim Landers - bass
- Eric Williams - acoustic and electric guitar, ukulele, mandolin, melodica and E-Bow
- Jim Lang - keyboards
- Steve Reid - percussion
- Larry Tuttle - Chapman Stick (2, 9)
- Novi Novog - viola (2, 4, 6, 9)
- Barbara Higbie - violin (4, 6)
- Tori Amos - backing vocals
- Nanci Shanks - backing vocals
- Lauren Wood - backing vocals

=== Musicians (track 1, 1995 recording) ===
- Ferron - lead vocals, acoustic guitar
- Amy Ray (Indigo Girls) - backing vocals, acoustic guitar
- Emily Saliers (Indigo Girls) - backing vocals, acoustic and electric guitars
- Sara Lee - bass
- Jerry Marotta - drums, percussion

=== Others ===
- Joe Chiccarelli - producer
- Ferron - producer (track 1 only)
- Susan Becker - assistant engineer
- Linda Cobb - art direction, design
- John Ewing, jr - assistant engineer, mixing assistant
- Chris Furman - engineering
- Brian Gardner - mastering
- Tim Harrigan - engineer
- Dan Marnien - engineering, mixing, remixing
- Raymond Meeks - photography
- David Skernick - photography
- Heidi Wills - hair stylist, make-up
