= Big City Rhythms =

Studio album by Michael Feinstein
- Released: October 9, 1999
- Recorded: August 2–4, 1999
- Genre: Vocal jazz
- Length: 64:37
- Label: Concord
- Producers: John Burk, Allen Sviridoff

Michael Feinstein chronology
Michael & George: Feinstein Sings Gershwin (1998)	Big City Rhythms (1999)	Romance on Film, Romance on Broadway (2000)

Maynard Ferguson chronology
Brass Attudes (1998)	Big City Rhythms (1999)

Big City Rhythms is a 1999 album by American vocalist Michael Feinstein accompanied by the Maynard Ferguson big band. It was Feinstein's second album for the Concord label, and his first with Maynard Ferguson.

== Reception ==
Professional ratings
Review scores
Source	Rating
Allmusic	4/5 stars

The Allmusic review by Jonathan Widran awarded the album 4 stars and said the pairing of Feinstein and Ferguson "such a rousing success that it's surprising the two didn't think of it before".

== Track listing ==
1. "Close Your Eyes" (Bernice Petkere) - 2:57
2. "The Very Thought of You" (Ray Noble) - 5:29
3. "Let Me Off Uptown" (Earl Bostic, Redd Evans) - 3:34
4. "Girl Talk" (Neal Hefti, Bobby Troup) - 5:07
5. "You Can't Lose 'Em All" (Marshall Barer, David Ross) - 4:33
6. "One Day at a Time" (Charles DeForest) - 3:54
7. "The Rhythm of the Blues" (Michael Feinstein, Lindy Robbins) - 5:52
8. "The One I Love (Belongs to Somebody Else)" (Isham Jones, Gus Kahn) - 5:25
9. "Ev'rything You Want Is Here" (Murray Grand) - 4:29
10. "Johnny One Note" (Lorenz Hart, Richard Rodgers) - 2:27
11. "Swing Is Back in Style" (Feinstein, Ray Jessel, Cynthia Thompson) - 2:38
12. "Love Is Nothin' But a Racket" (Betty Comden, Adolph Green, André Previn) - 3:27
13. "Lullaby in Rhythm" (Benny Goodman, Walter Hirsch, Clarence Profit, Edgar Sampson) - 3:25
14. Medley: "When Your Lover Has Gone"/"The Gal That Got Away" (Einar Aaron Swan)/(Harold Arlen, Ira Gershwin) - 4:59
15. "New York, New York" (Leonard Bernstein, Comden, Green, John Kander) - 3:38
16. "How Little We Know" (Hoagy Carmichael, Johnny Mercer) - 2:43

== Personnel ==
- Michael Feinstein - vocals, piano
- The Maynard Ferguson big band:
- Maynard Ferguson - bandleader, flugelhorn, producer, trumpet
- Tom Garling - arranger, trombone
- Brian Stahurski - double bass
- Albie Berk - drums
- Dave Throckmorton - drum set
- Bobby Shew - flugelhorn, trumpet
- Dennis Budimir - guitar
- Larry Bunker - percussion
- Earl MacDonald - piano
- Matt Catingub - alto saxophone
- Mike Dubaniewicz - alto saxophone
- Gary Foster
- Sal Lozano - baritone saxophone
- Jim Brenan - tenor saxophone
- Dan Higgins
- Alexander Iles - trombone
- Reggie Watkins - trombone
- Bryant Byers - bass trombone
- Adolfo Acosta - trumpet
- Wayne Bergeron
- Brian Ploeger - trumpet
- Jim Self - tuba
- Alan Broadbent - arranger, conductor
- Eddie Karam
- Mort Lindsey
- Patrick Williams

Production

- Charles Paakkari - assistant engineer
- Dann Thompson
- Albert Treskin - design
- Alexis Davis - director, production coordination
- Leslie Ann Jones - engineer, mixing
- Ken DiMaio - Live Sound Engineer
- Glen Barros - executive producer
- Antonio Branco - stylist
- Roger Dong - portrait photography
- Shay Ashula - hair stylist, make-up
- Paul Stubblebine - mastering
- Bill Hughes - music contractor, music preparation
- Bruce Burr - photography
- John Burk - producer
- Allen Sviridoff
