= Michael & George: Feinstein Sings Gershwin =

Studio album by Michael Feinstein
- Released: September 14, 1998
- Recorded: 1998
- Genre: Vocal jazz
- Length: 54:53
- Label: Concord
- Producers: David Tobocman, Bruce Roberts

Michael Feinstein chronology
Nobody But You (1998)	Michael & George: Feinstein Sings Gershwin (1998)	Big City Rhythms (1999)

Michael & George: Feinstein Sings Gershwin is a 1998 album by American vocalist Michael Feinstein of songs composed by George Gershwin. It was Feinstein's third album of Gershwin's music, following Pure Gershwin (1987) and Nice Work If You Can Get It: Songs by the Gershwins (1996).

== Reception ==
Professional ratings
Review scores
Source	Rating
Allmusic	2/5 stars

The Allmusic review by Rodney Batdorf awarded the album two stars, yet, somewhat incongruent with this rating, also said the album is "a joyous, irresistible album illustrating that not only is Feinstein's knowledge of Gershwin deep, but also that he knows how to keep the music alive with fresh, vibrant performances and arrangements".

== Track listing ==
All music composed by George Gershwin. All lyrics written by Ira Gershwin unless otherwise noted.

No.	Title	Writer(s)	Length
1.	"Embraceable You"		4:39
2.	"Nobody but You"	Buddy G. DeSylva; Arthur J. Jackson	3:52
3.	"Love Is Here to Stay"		4:10
4.	"Do It Again"	DeSylva	4:23
5.	"Of Thee I Sing"		3:47
6.	"Funny Face"		2:50
7.	"Lonely Boy"	DuBose Heyward	4:11
8.	"Shall We Dance?"		3:41
9.	"Oh, Gee! Oh, Joy!"	P. G. Wodehouse; I. Gershwin	3:10
10.	"Delishious"		5:25
11.	"I'll Build a Stairway to Paradise"	DeSylva; I. Gershwin	3:20
12.	"Love Walked In"		4:36
13.	"Comes the Revolution"		0:57
14.	"Soon"		3:19
15.	"Swanee"	Irving Caesar	2:33
Total length:			54:53

== Personnel ==
- Michael Feinstein - vocals, arranger, piano, liner notes
- David Tobocman - arranger, engineer, producer, programming, synthesizer orchestration
- Bruce Roberts - arranger, producer, programming, background vocals
- Chuck Berghofer - double bass
- Adrian Rosen
- Albie Berk - drums
- Mike Fletcher
- Gary Foster - flute, alto flute, alto saxophone
- Jim Fox - guitar
- Frederico Ramos
- Stan Freeman - piano
- Novi Novog - viola
- Arnold McCuller - background vocals
