= Backed Up =

Studio album by Ferron
- Released: 1978
- Genre: Folk
- Label: Lucy Records
- Producer: Ferron, Keith Maillard

Ferron chronology
Ferron (1977)	Backed Up (1978)	Testimony (1980)

Backed Up is the second album by the Canadian singer-songwriter Ferron, accompanied by a backing band. Produced by Ferron and Keith Maillard and released in 1978 by her own independent label Lucy Records, it includes early versions of several of the artist's most notable songs. The album was distributed by Ladyslipper Music.

== Track listing ==
All songs written by Ferron.

1. "Boom Boom"
2. "The Kids Song"
3. "Dear Marly"
4. "Willow Tree"
5. "White Wing Mercy"
6. "Light of My Light"
7. "Soggy Dream"
8. "I Come to Your Window"
9. "Call Me Friend"
10. "Misty Mountain"
11. "Testimony"

== Production and release ==
Backed Up was recorded with the same process and equipment as her previous album, on a two-track tape machine at a Vancouver television studio, with minimal processing except for equalization and peak limiting.

By March 1978, the album was completed and awaiting enough funding to manufacture it. Only 1,000 copies were subsequently pressed.

The closing song "Testimony" was written for the Bonnie Kreps film "This Film is About Rape." A friend of the filmmaker, Ferron was asked to contribute music. After struggling to fulfill the task, she drew upon her own experience as a rape survivor and finished the song the night before the deadline. "Somebody could say, 'What is the formula for writing a song like 'Testimony'?'" Ferron said in a CBC interview in 2017, who recalled writing the song in Toronto while searching for her biological father. "I don't know, almost die? Be very depressed and not know who you are and who your father is and where you're going and what is the purpose of life and why does everybody hate each other and why did they hurt me? If you put all that together and sit down somewhere and weep, you might write 'Testimony'. It's not a craft. Survival was the craft."

"Testimony" has gone on to be one of her signature songs, re-recorded as the title track of her 1980 album and covered by a number of other artists.

Another "fan favorite," "Misty Mountain," was written at age 22 while living in the basement of friend (and album producer) Keith Maillard. Strumming her guitar in total darkness, "I just started singing it and it was, I suppose, a prayer."

== Critical reception ==
"Ferron's music is genuine and intense, the spontaneous expression of the deep emotions she grapples with and communicates in her songs," said one critic, reviewing a concert of material from Backed Up, with Ferron accompanied by album players Keith Maillard and Stephen Nikleva. "It is impossible to really listen to Ferron without being moved." "Ferron is an intense, moving performer, a writer of haunting love songs: a singer of hypnotic ability, a self-taught guitar stylist, and an artist who still has enough rough edges that you can say you saw her "when," said The Vancouver Sun of the same lineup a few months later. In a review of the album, the Sun praised the strong collection of songs as comparable to her previous album, but noted that the addition of backing instruments resulted in some tracks feeling "shaky and crowded in places."

"As compelling and wonderful as her first record. Encompasses a variety of musical styles, with acoustic, baroque and electric instrumentation" - Ladyslipper Music

Although Backed Up has never been re-released, a number of songs appear, re-recorded, on other albums: "Dear Marly", "Light of My Light" and "Call Me Friend" appear on Not a Still Life. "White Wing Mercy" was re-recorded for Phantom Center. And versions of "Misty Mountain" and "Testimony" were recorded for 1980's breakthrough album Testimony.

Several songs have also been recorded by other artists. "Boom Boom" was recorded by Heather Bishop on Bellybutton in 1982. "The Kids Song" was recorded by Ronnie Gilbert in 1986 for the album Singing With You. "Testimony" has been covered by a number of artists, including Sweet Honey in the Rock, Holly Near and Ginni Clemmens, while "Misty Mountain" has been recorded by James Keelaghan and Toshi Reagon.

== Personnel ==
=== Musicians ===
- Ferron − lead vocals, electric and acoustic guitar
- Stephen Nikleva - lead guitar
- Keith Maillard - electric bass
- Prof. Fats Walker - modern and baroque violin
- Esmerelda - viola da gamba
- Joan Robertson - baroque flute
- Alec Willows - drums
- Rose Longini - baroque organ
- Stanley Cornfield - rhythm jazz guitar

=== Technical ===
- Rob Linschoten − engineering
- John Christie - assistant engineer
- Linda Hancock - chauffeur
- Jewel Brandreth - front cover photo
- Pat Feindel, Shawn Preus - back cover photos
- Patrice Snopkowski - cover design
- Petrine Burke - typesetting
