= Testimony (Ferron album) =

1980 studio album

Studio album by Ferron
- Released: 1980, 1981
- Studios: Blue Wave Recorders, Vancouver, BC, Canada; Goldrush Studios, Vancouver
- Genre: Folk rock
- Length: 39:42
- Labels: Lucy Records, Philo, Stony Plain Records
- Producers: Will MacCalder, Ferron

Ferron chronology
Backed Up (1978)	Testimony (1980)	Shadows on a Dime (1984)

Testimony is a folk album by the Canadian singer-songwriter Ferron. The album includes new material as well as songs that had previously appeared on earlier recordings, re-recorded with local session players and singers. It was first released in 1980 by independent label Lucy Records.

== Track listing ==
All songs written by Ferron. The original LP had five tracks per side, in the same order as the later CD.

1. "Almost Kissed"
2. "Rosalee"
3. "Our Purpose Here"
4. "Who Loses"
5. "Testimony"
6. "Bellybowl"
7. "Satin Blouse"
8. "O Baby"
9. "Misty Mountain"
10. "Ain't Life A Brook"

== Production and release ==
Testimony was Ferron's first professionally produced album, released by the independent label Lucy Records. According to Stephen Holden of The New York Times, the album was successful, with 5,000 sales within four months and 30,000 sales by 1983. Ferron said that she wrote most of the album's songs when she was younger. The folk songs have love between women as a theme.

== Critical reception ==
Professional ratings
Review scores
Source	Rating
Robert Christgau	A−
AllMusic	Favorable

Robert Christgau wrote that "Ferron's natural musicianship is something special: the light, grainy, 'halfway pretty' mezzo glances off sweet-and-sour words and melodies with a fetching ease that's never laid-back".

AllMusic's Joe Viglione called it "as expansive as k.d. lang and worthy of reaching the masses" and mused, "Would k.d. lang have had the opportunity if this work, Testimony, had not existed?".

== Personnel ==
=== Musicians ===
An asterisk refers to overdubbed parts for a 1981 re-release on Stony Plain Records; the presently available CD or download consists of the original recordings and does not include these.

- Ferron − lead vocals, acoustic guitar, production (6)
- Brent Shindell − acoustic and electric guitar
- Laurence Knight − Fender bass
- Chris Nordquist − drums
- Will McCalder − piano, organ
- Steven Nikleva − electric guitar
- Betty Chaba, Jane Mortifee, Charlotte Hodgkins Virtue − support vocals
- Jane Phillips − cello
- Blaine Dunaway − violin, string arrangements (5)
- Tom Hazlitt − acoustic bass
- Albert St. Albert − percussion
- Bobbie King − organ (6, 9*)
- Doug Edwards − bass (1*, 6, 9*)
- Jim Rothermel − sax, clarinet (6, 9*)
- Glen Hendrickson − drums (1*, 6, 9*)
- Gypsy − tambourine (9)

=== Others ===
- Brian Campbell − Engineering
- Simon Garber − Engineering (1*, 6, 9*)
- James LaBounty − Cover photograph
- Will MacCalder − Production (except 6)
- James O'Mara, David Sharpe / Portfolio − Album design
- Gayle Scott − art direction, B&W photography
