= Zlatina Deliradeva =

Bulgarian choral conductor

Zlatina Deliradeva (Bulgarian: Златина Делирадева; born 24 September 1942) is a Bulgarian choral conductor.

== Biography ==
Zlatina Deliradeva was born in Chirpan, Bulgaria. She was educated at the Bulgarian State Conservatory, now National Music Academy, where she studied choral conducting.

In 1972 Deliradeva became Conductor-in-Chief of the Detska Kitka Choir of Plovdiv, Bulgaria. In the ensuing decades, Deliradeva consolidated the choir.

Zlatina Deliradeva is a professor of Choral Conducting at the Plovdiv Academy of Music, Dance and Fine Arts. Between 1999 and 2008 she was the academy's Vice-Rector of Artistic Affairs.

Deliradeva has been the recipient of the Best Conductor Award from the international choral competition in Celje (Slovenia), the Golden Lyre Award of the Union of Bulgarian Musicians and Dancers, the St. St. Cyril and Methodius Order, the Plovdiv Award for Music, the Copper Chan Award and the Crystal Lyre Award of the Union of Bulgarian Musicians and Dancers, the Bulgarian Ministry of Culture and Radio FM Classic (2007). She is Honorary Citizen of her hometown Chirpan and received the Honorary Sign of Plovdiv (2007).
