= Remember: Michael Feinstein Sings Irving Berlin =

Studio album by Michael Feinstein
- Released: 1987
- Recorded: June 18–August 15, 1987
- Genre: Vocal jazz
- Length: 52:03
- Label: Asylum
- Producer: Herb Eisman

Michael Feinstein chronology
Pure Gershwin (1987)	Remember: Michael Feinstein Sings Irving Berlin (1987)	Isn't It Romantic (1988)

Remember: Michael Feinstein Sings Irving Berlin is a 1987 album by American vocalist Michael Feinstein of songs written by Irving Berlin.

== Reception ==
Professional ratings
Review scores
Source	Rating
Allmusic	3/5 stars

The Allmusic review by William Ruhlmann awarded the album three stars and said of Feinstein, "He captures the simple (and at times deceptively clever) sentiment of Berlin with an unadorned approach that brings out the sturdiness of the melodies as well".

== Track listing ==
1. "Let Me Sing and I'm Happy" - 3:38
2. "Change Partners" - 3:29
3. "Puttin' on the Ritz"/"Slumming on Park Avenue" - 3:13
4. "When the Midnight Choo Choo Leaves for Alabam'" - 2:50
5. "Better Luck Next Time" - 3:28
6. "I'm Putting All My Eggs in One Basket" - 2:15
7. "Remember"/"Always"/"What'll I Do" - 5:20
8. "How Deep Is the Ocean?/"Maybe It's Because I Love You Too Much" - 4:38
9. "What Chance Have I With Love?" - 2:53
10. "Looking at You (Across the Breakfast Table)"/"Just One Way to Say I Love You" - 3:28
11. "Let's Have Another Cup of Coffee"/"I Say It's Spinach (And the Hell with It)" - 3:56
12. "Say It Isn't So" - 4:22
13. "Alexander's Ragtime Band" - 4:27

All songs written by Irving Berlin.

== Personnel ==
- Michael Feinstein - vocals, piano, arranger
- Stan Freeman - arranger, piano
- David Ross
- Jeffery Fey - art direction, design
- Dennis Budimir - banjo, guitar
- Jim Hughart - double Bass
- George Belle - engineer
- Edward Jablonski - liner notes
