= The Palladium at the Center for the Performing Arts =

Concert hall in Carmel, Indiana, United States

Payne & Mencias Palladium
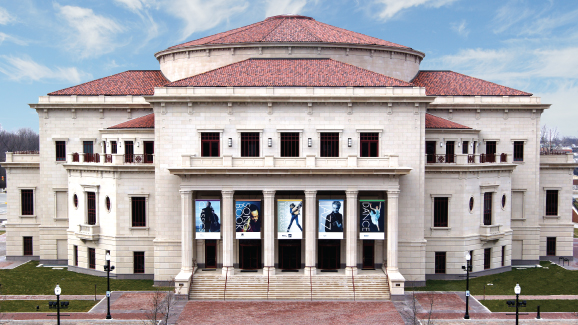
- South entrance of Payne & Mencias Palladium
- Interactive map of Payne & Mencias Palladium
- Full name: Payne & Mencias Palladium at Allied Solutions Center for the Performing Arts
- Address: 1 Carter Green; Carmel, Indiana; United States
- Coordinates: 39.9699°N 86.1303°W
- Operator: Allied Solutions Center for the Performing Arts
- Capacity: 1,600
- Type: Performing arts center

Construction
- Groundbreaking: Spring 2007
- Opened: January 29, 2011
- Years active: 2011—present
- Architect: David M. Schwarz Architects

Tenant
- Great American Songbook Foundation 2011—present

Website
- www.thecenterpresents.org

The Payne & Mencias Palladium at Allied Solutions Center for the Performing Arts is 1,500-seat, 151,000-square-foot (14,000 m^{2}) concert hall located in Carmel, Indiana.

After years of planning, the Palladium, one of three venues that comprises the Allied Solutions Center for the Performing Arts, opened on January 29, 2011, and today serves as a venue for internationally recognized artists.

The four-fronted, symmetrical design of the Palladium, massed around the domed central space of the single room concert hall was inspired by Andrea Palladio's Villa Capra, La Rotonda (1566). The Palladium is based upon the traditional shoebox-shaped concert hall with high ceilings and massive, sound-reflecting walls. The facility features a limestone façade and movable glass acoustical panels that can significantly alter the acoustics of the hall.

The Palladium was designed by David M. Schwarz Architects of Washington, D.C., with local consultation by CSO Architects as Architect of Record. Indianapolis-based Shiel Sexton Co. Inc. served as construction manager.

The Palladium is home to the Great American Songbook Foundation. The organization's administrative headquarters and Songbook Exhibit Gallery are located on the Gallery level.

The 6.5-acre Allied Solutions Center campus contains two buildings on its campus, the Palladium and the James Building, and houses six resident art companies: Actors Theatre of Indiana, Carmel Symphony Orchestra, Central Indiana Dance Ensemble, Civic Theatre, Gregory Hancock Dance Theatre, and Indiana Wind Symphony. The James Building contains the Booth Tarkington Civic Theater, a 41,747 square feet (3,878.4 m^{2}) 500-seat proscenium theater reminiscent of a Broadway theater, and the Studio Theatre, a 10,216 square feet (949.1 m^{2}) black box theater with flexible seating configurations.

Steven Libman was the founding President and CEO of the Center for the Performing Arts from 2009 to 2011. While there, he successfully planned and launched the first few seasons and produced two major opening night festival galas with Michael Feinstein, Chris Botti, Neil Sedaka, Dionne Warwick, David Hyde Pierce and dancers from American Ballet Theatre. He also produced a PBS special with Feinstein seen by 11 million viewers. The special, titled "Michael Feinstein: The Sinatra Project", was nominated for Outstanding Music Direction at the 64th Primetime Creative Arts Emmy Awards.

In 2012, Tania Castroverde Moskalenko was hired to lead the organization. She was previously the CEO at the Germantown Performing Arts Center in Germantown, Tennessee. Under her leadership, Allied Solutions Center continued to expand programming offered in its three venues and attained increased funding from individual and corporate sources. In March 2015, Allied Solutions Center began a significant relationship with Carmel-based Allied Solutions.

In August 2016, Moskalenko resigned from her position, and board chair Jeffrey C. McDermott assumed the role of interim president and CEO. One year later, McDermott was officially elected by Allied Solutions Center Board as the new full time president and CEO.

McDermott announced a seven-year sponsorship agreement with Allied Solutions, a Securian Financial Group subsidiary, in September 2024 that resulted in a name change and rebrand of the campus. Allied Solutions Center soon after entered a 10-year philanthropic agreement with two local families that resulted in the renaming of the Palladium.

== See also ==
- List of music venues in the United States
