= Great American Songbook Foundation =

American organization

The Great American Songbook Foundation
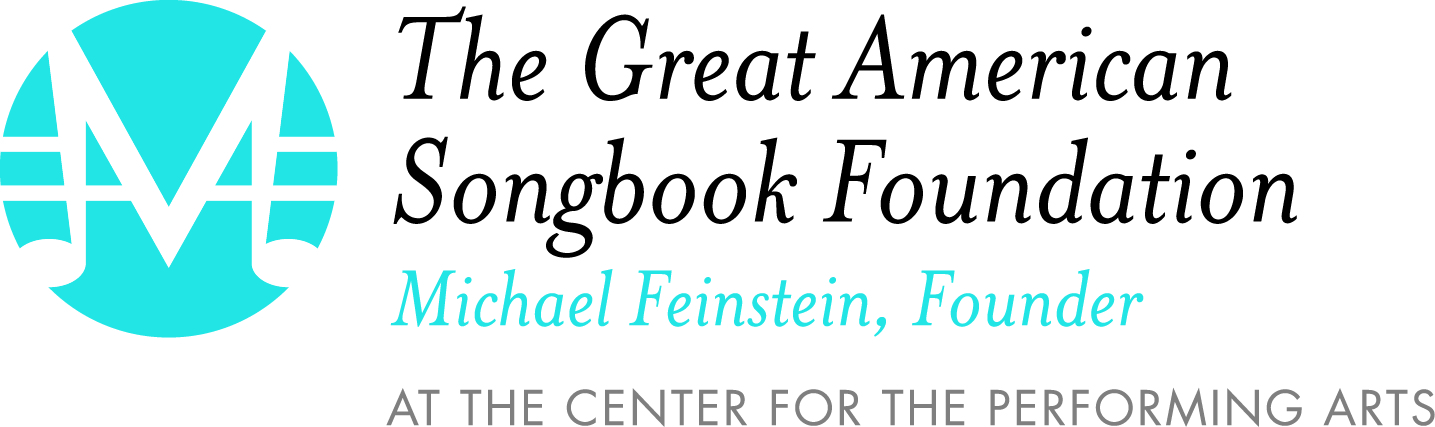
- Formation: 2007
- Founder: Michael Feinstein
- Type: Non-profit organization
- Purpose: The mission of the Great American Songbook Foundation is to inspire & educate by celebrating the Great American Songbook.
- Headquarters: The Palladium at the Center for the Performing Arts
- Location: Carmel, Indiana
- Executive Director: Christopher Lewis
- Affiliations: Allied Solutions Center for the Performing Arts; Grammy Museum
- Website: thesongbook.org
- Formerly called: Feinstein Foundation for the Education and Preservation of the Great American Songbook; Michael Feinstein Great American Songbook Initiative

The Great American Songbook Foundation is a 501(c)(3) nonprofit organization dedicated to the preservation and promotion of the music of the Great American Songbook. The Songbook Foundation's administrative offices and Songbook Exhibit Gallery are located on the Gallery level of Payne & Mencias Palladium at Allied Solutions Center for Performing Arts in Carmel, Indiana. The Songbook Library & Archives are housed offsite nearby.

Previously known as the Feinstein Foundation for the Education and Preservation of the Great American Songbook and as the Michael Feinstein Great American Songbook Initiative, the organization took its current name in 2014.

The Songbook Foundation's mission is "to inspire and educate by celebrating the music of the Great American Songbook."

== History and operation ==
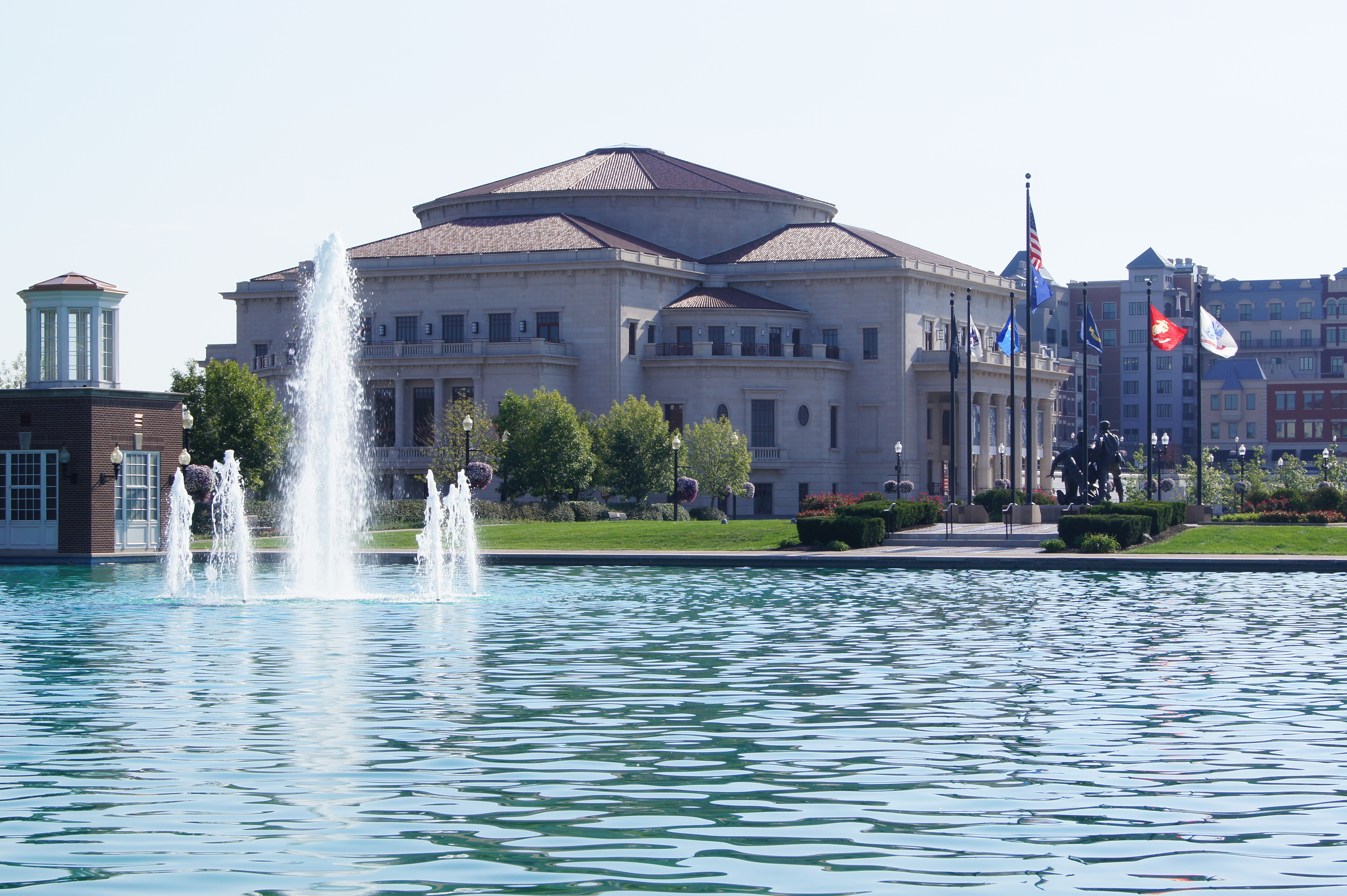
Payne & Mencias Palladium at Allied Solutions Center for the Performing Arts

Michael Feinstein founded the organization in 2007. Upon Feinstein's appointment as artistic director of Allied Solutions Center for the Performing Arts in 2009, the organization made a commitment to move its headquarters and archives on the center's campus in Carmel, Indiana.

The Great American Songbook Foundation's administrative headquarters houses a reference library, study and listening rooms for researchers, archival storage space, and the Songbook Exhibit Gallery, an exhibit space featuring rotating interactive presentations about the music, its creators and the performers of the Great American Songbook.

In 2023, the Songbook Foundation announced its agreement with the City of Carmel to open a stand-alone music museum.

== Education and outreach ==
=== Songbook Exhibit Gallery ===
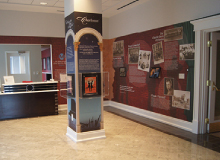
The Songbook Exhibit Gallery is located in the Songbook Foundation's administrative headquarters in Carmel, Indiana.

The Songbook Exhibit Gallery features rotating exhibits. These exhibits helps guests to place the music of this era in context with the events that occurred in the 20th-century United States. The Songbook Foundation offers corresponding educational programs and guided tours for school groups, civic and professional organizations, and members of the general public.

Since 2011, the Songbook Foundation has presented the following exhibits: "G.I. Jive: The Music and Entertainers of World War II" (2011), "The Great American Songbook" (2012), "Blast from the Past: Roaring Hot '20s Jazz" (2013), "A Change Is Gonna Come: 1960s Broadway Musicals" (2014), "Gus Kahn: The Man Behind the Music" (2015), "The Great Indiana Songbook: Two Centuries of Hoosier Music" (2016), "Ella Sings the Songbook" (2017), "The Unsinkable Meredith Willson" (2018), "The Andrews Sisters: Queens of the Jukebox" (2019) "Of Thee I Sing: Politics on Stage" (2019–2021). The current display, "From the Jazz Age to Streaming: The Soundtrack of the 20s-20s," was first installed in 2021. Additionally, the Songbook Foundation lends traveling exhibits and provides adapted online exhibits and Songbook Library & Archives collections highlights.

These exhibits focus on different time periods, styles, and artists. In addition to the interactive display which houses clips and short biographies of several decades of singers and songwriters, each exhibit displays artifacts from the Songbook Library & Archives that relate to the music and musicians being highlighted in the Songbook Gallery exhibits.

=== The Songbook Academy ===
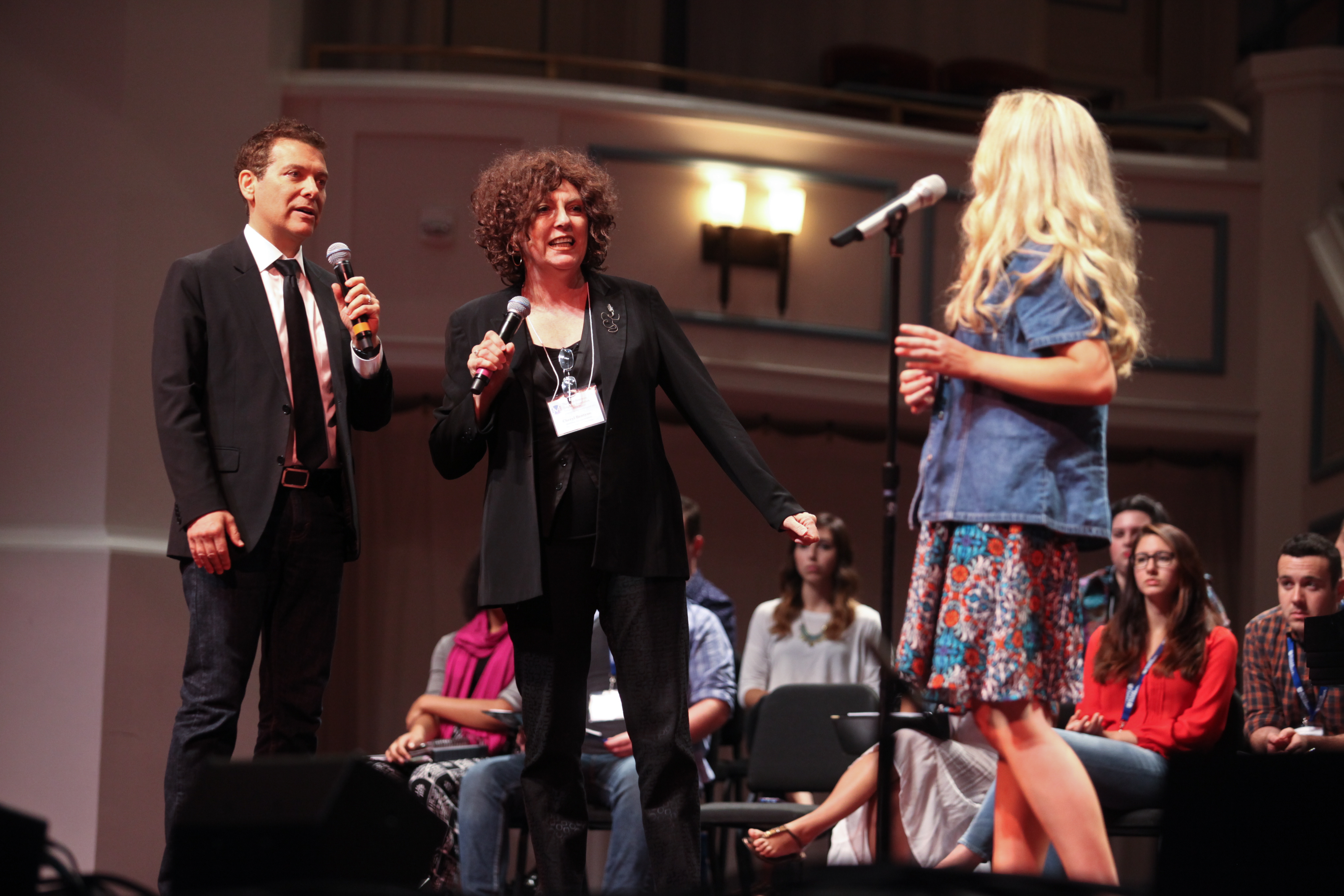
Songbook Academy founder Michael Feinstein and Grammy-winner Cheryl Bentyne of The Manhattan Transfer coaching participants in the 2014 Songbook Academy

The Songbook Academy is an educational summer music intensive held by the Great American Songbook Foundation. Formerly known as the High School Vocal Academy and Competition, the program originated in 2009 and trains cohorts of up to 40 high school vocalists annually. The Songbook Foundation states on its website, "At the Songbook Academy, we believe that every young singer has a unique story to tell through music."

The Songbook Academy has undergone significant evolution since its founding. During its inception, the program invited high school students to compete in regional competitions to culminate in a final competition at the Songbook Foundation's headquarters. The program changed in 2015 to accommodate 40 students in a single location at Allied Solutions Center for the Performing Arts. In response to the COVID-19 pandemic, the program temporarily transitioned to an online format in 2020, eliminating its competitive element. The summer intensive has maintained a non-competitive focus on education since resuming in-person programming in 2022.

Winners of the earlier competition format were commemorated as Great American Songbook Youth Ambassadors. Each Youth Ambassador won a $3,000 scholarship and a trip to New York City to perform alongside Michael Feinstein. Today, the Songbook Foundation celebrates the professional growth of each student by providing alumni avenues to share achievements and coordinating additional networking and performance opportunities.

Great American Songbook Youth Ambassadors (2009–2019)
Winner	Hometown	Year	Ref.
Julia Bonnett	Carmel, Indiana	2009	
Annie Yokom	Naperville, Illinois	2010	
event on hiatus		2011	
Nick Ziobro	Manlius, New York	2012	
Julia Goodwin	Baldwinsville, New York	2013	
Maddie Baillio	League City, Texas	2014	
Lucas DeBard	Lebanon, Indiana	2015	
Brighton Thomas	Burbank, California	2016	
Finn Sagal	La Cañada Flintridge, California	2017	
Lily Rasmussen	Lexington, Kentucky	2018	
Sadie Fridley	Syracuse, New York	2019	

=== Songbook Hall of Fame ===
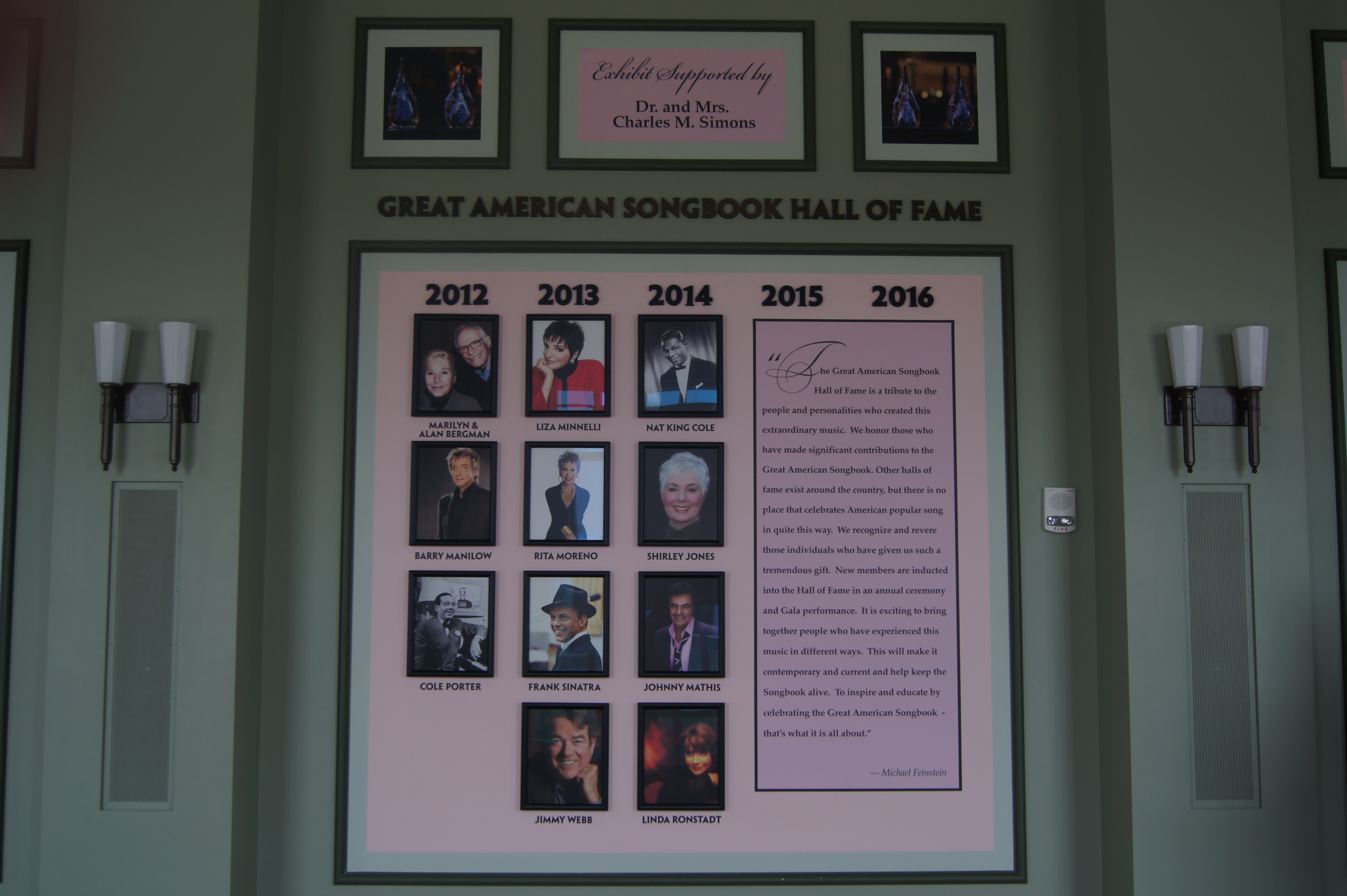
The Great American Songbook Hall of Fame exhibit on display at Payne & Mencias Palladium.

The Great American Songbook Hall of Fame is a tribute to people who have contributed to the genre, memorializing composers, performers, and lyricists who have added to the history of the Songbook. Artists are nominated and selected based on the following criteria:

- Legend Award: Artists who made a significant contribution to the Golden Age of American popular music, typically defined as the period from the early years of the Twentieth century through the 1960s;
- Songbook Award: Living songwriters, both lyricists and composers, who have made a significant impact on American pop culture by creating the most beloved songs from the American popular songbook; and
- New Standard Award: Artists, songwriters and/or performers who continues to create the soundtrack of our lives by writing and/or performing music that will become the pop standards of tomorrow."

In the past, the Songbook Foundation and Allied Solutions Center for the Performing Arts hosted live performances in celebration of the lives and careers of the artists selected for induction into the Great American Songbook Hall of Fame. Nominees, or their representatives, were invited to Carmel and honored with tribute performances celebrating their achievements. In recent years, the Songbook Hall of Fame has evolved into an online educational resource for fans around the world with programming to celebrate inductees hosted virtually and in-person year round.

Songbook Hall of Fame Honorees
Artist(s)	Years active	Award	Year	Area of Achievement	Ref.
Barry Manilow	1964–present	New Standard Award	2012	Creator of ten chart-topping singles and five best-selling albums in the 1970s, while simultaneously producing albums for Bette Midler, Nancy Wilson (jazz singer), and Dionne Warwick.	
Cole Porter	1920s–1958	Legend Award	2012	Composer and lyricist of several successful Broadway shows and films, such as Paris (1928) and Kiss Me, Kate (1948)	
Rita Moreno	1943–present	New Standard Award	2013		
Liza Minnelli	1949–present	New Standard Award	2013		
Jimmy Webb	1965–present	Songbook Award	2013		
Frank Sinatra	1935–1995	Legend Award	2013		
Alan and Marilyn Bergman	1950s–2017	Songbook Award	2014	Longstanding career of more than 50 years. Recipients of sixteen Academy Awards, two Grammy Awards, three Emmy Awards, and one Ace Award.	
Johnny Mathis	1956–present	Songbook Award	2014		
Shirley Jones	1950–present	New Standard Award	2014		
Linda Ronstadt	1965–2011	New Standard Award	2014		
Nat King Cole	1934–1965	Legend Award	2014		
Steve Lawrence & Eydie Gormé	1950–2019	New Standard Award	2015		
Chita Rivera	1950–2024	New Standard Award	2015		
George Gershwin & Ira Gershwin	1910s–1950s	Legend Award	2015		
Diahann Carroll	1950–2016	New Standard Award	2016		
Dionne Warwick	1955–present	New Standard Award	2016		
Hoagy Carmichael	1918–1981	Legend Award	2016		
Ray Gilbert	1940s–1960s	Legend Award	2017		
Mitzi Gaynor	1944–2021	New Standard Award	2017		
Ella Fitzgerald	1934–1993	Legend Award	2017		
Marilyn Maye	1946–present	New Standard Award	2018		
Jimmy Van Heusen	1930s–1970s	Legend Award	2018		
Rosemary Clooney	1946–2002	Legend Award	2018		
Paul Williams	1964–present	Songbook Award	2019		
Duke Ellington	1914–1974	Legend Award	2019		
Doris Day	1939–2012	Legend Award	2019		
Tony Bennett	1936–2021	New Standard Award	2019		
Meredith Willson	1921−1982	Songbook Award	2020		
Peggy Lee	1936–2000	Songbook Award	2020		
Billy Strayhorn	1934–1964	Legend Award	2021		
Melissa Manchester	1971–present	New Standard Award	2021		
Sammy Cahn	1935–1982	Legend Award	2021		
Straight No Chaser	1996–2000 2008–present	New Standard Award	2022		
The Manhattan Transfer	1969–2023	New Standard Award	2022		
The Lennon Sisters	1955–present	New Standard Award	2022		
Judy Garland	1924–1969	Legend Award	2023		

=== GRAMMY Museum Cultural Affiliation ===
In July 2017, the Los Angeles-based Grammy Museum announced that the Great American Songbook Foundation has been designated as a Cultural Affiliate, joining four other institutions worldwide: the Bob Marley Museum in Kingston, Jamaica; the Woody Guthrie Center in Tulsa, OH; The Beatles Story in Liverpool, UK; and the National Blues Museum in St. Louis, MO. The relationships allows for collaboration between the organizations on exhibits and educational and research programs, among other amenities.

=== Perfect Harmony Music Program ===
Founded in 2015, the Songbook Foundation's Perfect Harmony program offers music activities to people with Alzheimer's, dementia and other neurodegenerative diseases. This program was initially launched in collaboration with the Greater Indiana Chapter of the Alzheimer's Association. and has since evolved to independently offer monthly resources online. Each Perfect Harmony resource is designed for participants and caregivers to become involved in social singing, discussions, and low-impact movement exercises to a thematic selection of popular music. As a group, people share experiences related to memorable songs and the monthly theme.

=== Songbook Film Series ===
The Great American Songbook Foundation partnered with Indianapolis-based Heartland International Film Festival to present classic movie musicals to the public, cultivating a new generation of movie lovers. Some screenings included guest speakers, who enlightened audiences on the nature and creation of the movies shown.

== Archives, library, and preservation ==
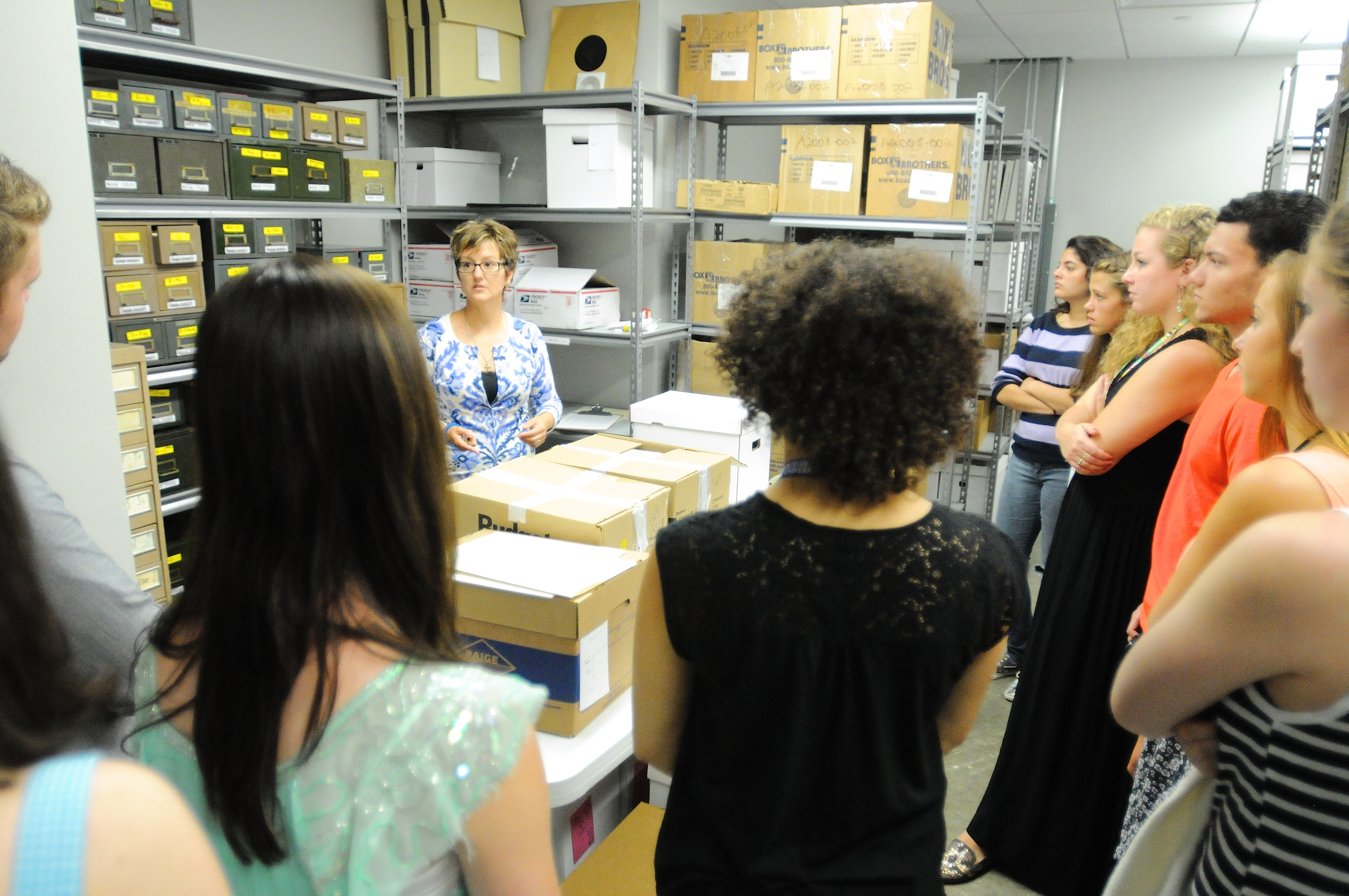
A group of high school students tours the Songbook Archives, which are adjacent to the Songbook Foundation's administrative headquarters.

The Songbook Library & Archives serves as a repository for the papers of significant Songbook figures including Meredith Willson, Hy Zaret, and Gus Kahn, as well as special collections covering such artists as The Andrews Sisters, spanning a range of formats: sheet music, photos, scrapbooks, posters, music magazines, books, LPs, 45s, lacquer disc, personal papers, theatre playbills, film, video, analog tape, and recordings. Many items in the collection are now a hundred years old.

The Songbook Foundation's non-circulating research library houses a wide variety of reference materials. Students, teachers, and researchers from around the world access the Archives website to view and research over one hundred collections, 35,000 pieces of sheet music, and 3,000 reference books.

Items in the Songbook Foundation Archives include:

- 7,000 audio recordings in thirteen different formats, including Rudy Vallée's radio transcription discs dating from 1932;
- Meredith Willson's personal papers, scripts, and recordings, including The Music Man and The Unsinkable Molly Brown;
- Musical orchestrations from Bob and Dolores Hope's decades of live performances across the globe;
- Pianos owned by Songbook composers Richard A. Whiting, Harold Arlen, Johnny Mercer, and Irving Berlin;
- Hy Zaret's original lyrics for "Unchained Melody", one of the twentieth century's most frequently recorded songs.

== See also ==
- List of music museums
- Great American Songbook
- Heartland International Film Festival
