= Keith Maillard =

Canadian writer

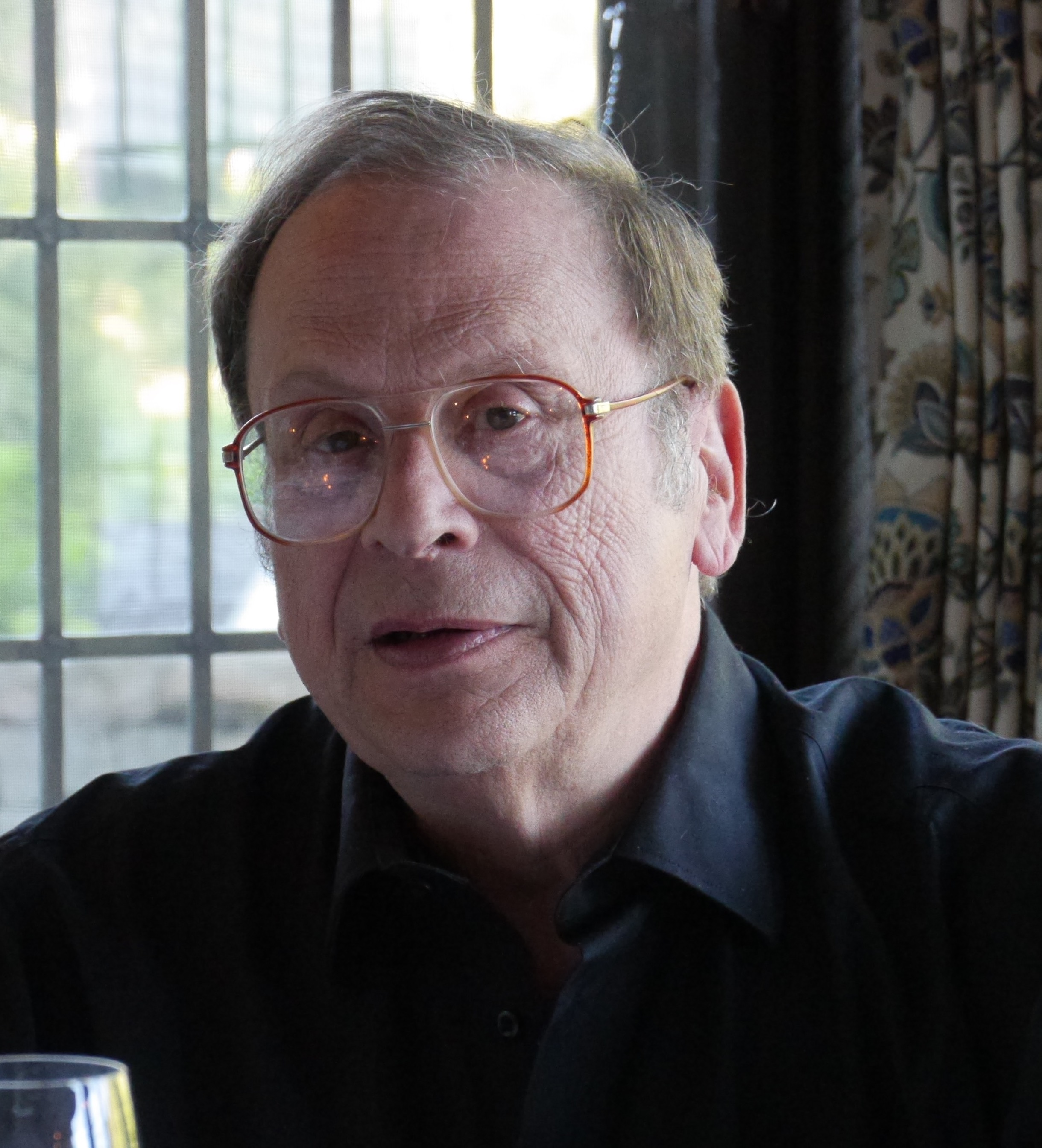
- Keith Maillard, Salt Spring Island, BC, 2015
- Born: 28 February 1942 (age 84); Wheeling, West Virginia, U.S.
- Occupations: Author; Educator

Keith Maillard (born 28 February 1942, in Wheeling, West Virginia) is an American Canadian novelist, poet, and professor of creative writing at the University of British Columbia. He moved to Canada in 1970 (due to his opposition to the Vietnam War) and became a Canadian citizen in 1976.

== Family background ==
Maillard has French, Canadian, and American roots. His Huguenots great grandparents immigrated to Montreal from Lyon, France, in the early 1880s. His Maillard grandfather and two Montreal-born uncles continued the family tradition of glass-blowing, working for Dominion Glass in Montreal and in Redcliff, Alberta.

Maillard's parents divorced when he was a baby and he never knew his father. His father, Eugene C. Maillard, avoided glassblowing work, trained as a draughtsman, and worked for twenty-five years at the Hanford Site nuclear plant in Richland, Washington. Maillard's mother's family settled in the Ohio River Valley in the late 18th century and it is from her family stories that Maillard draws inspiration for much of his historical fiction. He describes the process of his earliest childhood fiction in his 2011 essay, "Kilroy: A Writer's Childhood."

Keith Maillard is married with two daughters and lives in West Vancouver. His mother-in-law is Canadian novelist Rohan O'Grady.

== Career ==
=== 1960s ===
Maillard left his native West Virginia in 1965 and moved to Boston where he lived for five years. He worked in the anti-Vietnam-war movement from 1968 to 1970 and contributed numerous articles to Boston underground newspapers and radio: Fusion, Broadside, The Free Press of Boston and WBUR. In 1970, disillusioned after the Kent State shootings, he emigrated to Canada. He was not eligible for the draft and was a war resister rather than a draft dodger.

=== 1970s ===
In the early 1970s, Maillard worked as a freelancer for CBC Radio, contributing pieces to This Country in the Morning, Five Nights, and Our Native Land. He also contributed to periodicals, including Fusion, The Body Politic, Malahat Review, Books in Canada, Canadian Literature, and newspapers. He was in the Writers' Union of Canada, served on the National Council for two years, and co-founded the Federation of BC Writers. Maillard studied music at Vancouver Community College, played the Irish pipes, taught recorder and the rudiments of music for the Vancouver School Board and Vancouver Community College, and played bass in the first band formed by Vancouver singer-songwriter, Ferron. He co-produced and arranged her second album Backed Up in 1978. In the late 1970s Maillard taught writing workshops in Vancouver's literary centre, The Literary Storefront, and participated in a number of readings and other events there. In 1979 Maillard interviewed Canadian novelist Howard O’Hagan who explained to him his writing process; the interview appeared as a chapter in Margery Fee's Silence Made Visible: Howard O’Hagan and Tay John (1992).

Maillard's first published novel, Two Strand River, appeared in 1976, published by Dave Godfrey's Press Porcépic. Most reviewers were confounded by this strange book with its cross-gendered protagonists and weird events, but Two Strand River soon acquired a cult following, came to be labeled a classic of Canadian magic realism, and has been republished twice.

=== 1980s ===
Maillard's second published novel was actually the first one he had begun; the book rejected by 26 publishers finally – after having passed through eight major rewrites – appeared in 1980 as Alex Driving South. In this gritty, naturalistic tale, Maillard first introduced the fictional town of Raysburg, West Virginia, where most of his novels have been set. The Knife in My Hands, influenced by American writer Jack Kerouac, followed in 1981, and its sequel, Cutting Through, in 1982. Then, with a fifth book half-completed, Maillard was afflicted with writer's block.

From 1985 through 1988 Maillard applied his writing skills to designing university and adult education courses for the Open Learning Agency and, from 1986 to 1989, he workshopped his screenplay, Two Strand River, with Patricia Gruben's Praxis Film Development Workshop (Simon Fraser University).

Maillard's fifth novel, Motet, published in 1989, won the Ethel Wilson Fiction Prize. Reviewer David Homel assured readers that despite the novel's sixteenth-century Dutch choral mystery and Vancouver setting, "power and madness made in the USA is still at the heart of Maillard's creativity."

Having taught as a sessional lecturer at both the University of British Columbia (UBC) and Simon Fraser University, Maillard was appointed in 1989 to a regular teaching position in UBC's Creative Writing Department, where he has taught every genre except stage writing. He served as Advisory Editor of PRISM international for 10 years.

=== 1990s ===
While at UBC, Maillard began what he considers his mature work – what has come to be known as the "Raysburg Series." Called "a small masterpiece" by the Georgia Straight, Light in the Company of Women was published in 1993 and was runner-up for the Ethel Wilson Fiction Prize. It was followed in 1995 by Hazard Zones, which was included on the Toronto Star's list of the best Canadian books for that year and was short-listed for the Commonwealth Writers' Prize.

Maillard's novel, Gloria (1999), was well received in Canada, short-listed for the Governor General's Literary Award for Fiction, and brought him national attention in the United States.

Maillard also returned to his first love, poetry, and published Dementia Americana, which won the Gerald Lampert Award for the best first book of poetry published in Canada. He became interested in the re-emergence of formal poetry in North America and commented about it in his oft-cited essay, "The New Formalism and the Return of Prosody."

=== 2000s ===
The last of the "Raysburg Series", The Clarinet Polka (2002), was well received in the United States, particularly by the Polish American community. It received starred reviews from Library Journal, Publishers Weekly, Booklist, and Kirkus Reviews, and was included in Booklist’s Editors’ Choice ’03. It won the Polish American Historical Association's Creative Arts Prize, and came to the attention of scholars in Poland.

Maillard was one of 35 writers placed on the West Virginia Literary Map in 2004 and he was inducted that year into the Wheeling, West Virginia, Hall of Fame.

In 2004, Maillard returned to the raw Bildungsroman material first published in The Knife in My Hands and Cutting Through and rewrote and reshaped it into the Difficulty at the Beginning quartet, which appeared in four volumes between September 2005 and September 2006. The Toronto Globe and Mail selected Difficulty at the Beginning as one of the top books of 2006, calling it "a work of terrible beauty and grace, a masterpiece fit to contend with the best novels of the last century." Reviewer Richard Helm describes the quartet as Maillard's "magnum opus and the keystone of a literary career that has flown largely under the Canadian radar." He characterizes Maillard as "probably the most famous Canadian novelist you've never heard of."

In 2006, with eleven out of fourteen titles nominated for or winners of literary awards, Maillard won UBC's Dorothy Somerset Award for excellence in the creative arts.

=== 2010s ===
In its 80th anniversary edition in 2015, the Quill & Quire listed Maillard as one of Canada's "notable Canlit talent" along with other American-born anti-Vietnam-War authors, Philip Marchand, Jack Todd, Judith Merrill, Mark Frutkin, and William Gibson.

In his novel Twin Studies (2018)—set in Vancouver, Medicine Hat, and Los Angeles—Maillard returns to the topic of gender fluidity that he first explored in Two Strand River in 1976. Apple's iBooks reviewed the novel and described it as "a fascinating exploration of wealth, class, and gender fluidity [that] reads like a 21st-century Canadian version of Dickens' London novels." Steven Beattie, in the September 2018 issue of Quill & Quire, notes that Maillard's subject matter arises out of lived experience. "When the author began publishing, the language for describing gender-fluid approaches did not exist." As Maillard himself put it in his interview with Beattie, "You can't apply a term to yourself unless it is culturally available. I would now call myself non-binary."

The Vancouver Sun summarized Twin Studies as "that rare work: a story that grapples with difficult intellectual issues without ever abandoning the novelist's primary duty—compelling narrative." Maillard’s novel challenges the idea of isolated nuclear families and envisions what he says is “a fluid larger family, in which people come together for other reasons. I think it's essential that we start rethinking family, that we start rethinking our connections to each other.”

Twin Studies won the Alberta Book of the Year Award from the Book Publishers Association of Alberta and was shortlisted for the Relit Award. In an interview with Quentin Mills-Fenn of Prairie books Now, Maillard explained that his book explores ”the impact of traumatic experiences,” and that he firmly believes that “[p]hysicians and therapists who work with children and adolescents are telling us that a gender-affirming point of view from parents and, if possible, from the surrounding culture, makes for healthy and happy kids."

Maillard's first non-fiction book, Fatherless: A Memoir (2019), traces the life of the mysterious father he never knew, and was well received in Canada. CBC Arts columnist and creative nonfiction author/editor Alicia Elliott writes that Maillard's memoir "gives us a model of not only self awareness and honesty but also, more importantly, healing." Appalachian Review praises Fatherless as “a book that is sometimes heartbreaking, often lighthearted, and always honest,” noting that “Maillard manages to examine the roughest edges of his family history with harsh truth without begging for the reader’s sympathy.”

=== 2020s ===
Author and scholar Daniel Heath Justice praises Maillard’s second book of non-fiction, The Bridge: Writing Across the Binary (2021). “Through constellated fragments of memory, key moments in twentieth-century America, and the unfolding of an acclaimed literary life,” Justice writes, “The Bridge is the forthright, deeply moving memoir of a nonbinary writer coming of age and coming to self.” Calling Keith Maillard “one of the finest English-language novelists in Canada today,” The Vancouver Sun writes that “Maillard understands his life through the lens of a lifelong struggle to know and accept his own identity off the simple-minded male/female binary.” Rachel Giese, author of Boys: What It Means to Become a Man, views Maillard’s The Bridge as “a valuable addition to literature about the lives and histories of trans and non-binary people.” Reviewer Margaret Goldik informs her readers that Maillard “recounts with impressive honesty not only his writing journey, but also his journey toward understanding his gender dysphoria.”

Maillard’s fifteenth novel, In the Defense of Liberty (2023), “expertly captures the ethos of the mid-1960s and explores threads of gender and sexuality, while holding up a mirror to the roots of modern-day American polarization.” Reviewer Thomas McLeod writes that a “large share of the book is concerned with questions about how people interpret history, both within their university setting and in the fiery political climate of the Civil Rights era. Though Maillard is not a historian, he offers parallels between the past and present, and asserts that the historical narratives each character tells are inherently political.” Journalist Tom Sandborn, who has followed Maillard’s literary career for over thirty years, notes that Liberty “continues and deepens the meditation on American masculinity and its discontents that has informed so much of Maillard’s work.” Sandborn postulates that Maillard might have “the best claim to be the true voice of America in the 1960s.” Author Lenore Rountree observes that “In the Defense of Liberty is not only untethered to its era, it is a fine example of a contemporary view from a historical perspective—the seeds we sowed then are the seeds we still sow now.”

In an interview with Massy Books, Maillard emphasizes that “the liberty that my characters pursue is the freedom to be themselves—to be, wholly and authentically, who they are already.” When asked what he would like readers to take away from his novel, he responds, “In the Defense of Liberty is being published at a time when LGBTQ2S+ people are being attacked in a concerted and vicious way…. An anti-queer position now appears to be essential to a conservative position, and that applies in Canada as well as in the States. I want In the Defense of Liberty to be saying to those fascists, no, you won’t.”

Maillard is profiled by the West Virginia Humanities Council in their 2023 online celebration of West Virginia authors. His full interview with journalist Kate Long covers topics ranging from growing up in West Virginia and settling in British Columbia, to writing, music, and history.

On September 28, 2024, Keith Maillard was awarded the Lieutenant Governor's Award for Literary Excellence. The jury citation noted not only Maillard’s craft of writing but his efforts to uplift new voices. “He has had a profound influence on writers and his students/mentees all speak of a specific kindness and generosity, a genuine willingness to find what a writer needs to say and to help them hone their unique style and voice. We recognize that a career of excellence involves far more than what meets the reader on a page. Writers with influence touch people. They work in life’s margins to foster creativity, courage, exploration and self-discovery.”

Maillard's papers are currently held by the University of British Columbia's Rare Books and Special Collections. A complete list of Maillard's publications can be found on his website.

== Legal issues ==
In 2021, former UBC professor Steven Galloway lodged defamation lawsuits against Maillard and over 20 other people on the grounds that they had helped perpetuate false allegations of sexual assault and misconduct against him in 2015. After an extensive pre-trial process he reached a confidential settlement with Galloway in 2026, a few months before the trial was due to proceed.

== Awards and recognition ==
- 1986: winner Praxis Competition, Two Strand River
- 1990: winner Ethel Wilson Fiction Prize, Motet
- 1994: runner-up Ethel Wilson Fiction Prize, Light in the Company of Women
- 1995: winner Gerald Lampert Award, Dementia Americana
- 1996: shortlisted Commonwealth Writers' Prize, Hazard Zones
- 1999: finalist Governor General's Awards, Gloria
- 2004: winner West Virginia Literary Merit Award
- 2004: inducted Wheeling Hall of Fame
- 2005: winner Polish American Historical Association Creative Arts Prize, The Clarinet Polka
- 2005: shortlisted Weatherford Award, Running
- 2006: shortlisted Weatherford Award, Morgantown
- 2006: shortlisted Weatherford Award, Lyndon Johnston and the Majorettes
- 2006: longlisted ReLit Awards, Looking Good
- 2006: The Globe 100 Running
- 2006: The Globe 100 Morgantown
- 2006: The Globe 100 Lyndon Johnson and the Majorettes
- 2006: The Globe 100 Looking Good
- 2007: winner Dorothy Somerset Award for Excellence in the Creative Arts
- 2018: The Globe 100 Twin Studies
- 2019: winner Alberta Book of the Year Award: Trade Fiction, Twin Studies
- 2019: shortlisted ReLit Awards, Twin Studies
- 2024: winner Lieutenant Governor's Award for Literary Excellence

== Bibliography ==
- 1976: Two Strand River (Press Porcepic) ISBN 0-88878-088-5
  - 1982 reissue: Two Strand River (General Publishing) ISBN 0-7736-7031-9
  - 1996 reissue: Two Strand River (HarperCollins) ISBN 0-00-648143-4
  - 2013 reissue: Two Strand River (Keith Maillard) ebook ASIN BOOCOKVS4A
- 1980: Alex Driving South (Dial Press) ISBN 0-8037-0196-9
  - 1983 reissue: Alex Driving South (General Publishing) ISBN 0-7736-7045-9
  - 2013 reissue: Alex Driving South (Keith Maillard) ebook ASIN BOOB7ABDL2
- 1981: The Knife in my Hands (General) ISBN 0-7737-0057-9
  - 1982 reissue: The Knife in my Hands (Beaufort) ISBN 978-0-825-30082-0
- 1982: Cutting Through (Stoddart) ISBN 0-7737-2003-0
  - 1983 reissue: Cutting Through (Beaufort) ISBN 0-8253-0120-3
- 1989: Motet (Random House) ISBN 0-394-22028-5
  - 1997 reissue: Motet (HarperCollins) ISBN 0-00-648163-9
  - 1998 reissue: Motet (Harvill Press) ISBN 978-0-00-648163-8
  - 2013 reissue: Motet (Keith Maillard) ebook ASIN BOOAYB4N5S
- 1993: Light in the Company of Women (HarperCollins) ISBN 0-00-223894-2
- 1994: Dementia Americana, poems (Ronsdale/Cacanadadada) ISBN 0-921870-28-0
- 1995: Hazard Zones (Harper Perennial) ISBN 0-00-224397-0
- 1999: Gloria (Harper Flamingo) ISBN 0-00-648175-2
  - 2000: reissue: Gloria (Soho Press) ISBN 978-1-56947-206-4
  - 2001: reissue: Gloria (HarperFlamingo) ISBN 978-0-00-648175-1
- 2002: The Clarinet Polka (Thomas Allen) ISBN 0-88762-100-7
  - 2003: reissue: The Clarinet Polka (St.Martin's Press) ISBN 0-312-30889-2
  - 2004: reissue: The Clarinet Polka (St.Martin's Griffin) ISBN 978-0-312-30890-2
- 2005: Running (Brindle & Glass) ISBN 1-897142-06-4
  - 2011: Running (Brindle & Glass) ebook ASIN BOOSVSX3LG
- 2006: Morgantown (Brindle & Glass) ISBN 1-897142-07-2
  - 2011: Morgantown (Brindle & Glass) ebook ASIN BOOSVXS1J0
- 2006: Lyndon Johnson and the Majorettes (Brindle & Glass) ISBN 1-897142-08-0
  - 2011: Lyndon Johnson and the Majorettes (Brindle & Glass) ebook ASIN BOOSVXS3DY
- 2006: Looking Good (Brindle & Glass) ISBN 1-897142-09-9
  - 2011: Looking Good (Brindle & Glass) ebook ASIN BOOSVXS1K4
- 2018: Twin Studies (Freehand Press) ISBN 1-988298-31-8
  - 2018: Twin Studies (Audible) audiobook ASIN BO7JPJKDFY
- 2019: Fatherless (University of West Virginia Press) ISBN 978-1-949199-13-0
- 2021: The Bridge: Writing Across the Binary (Freehand Press) ISBN 978-1-988298-78-8
- 2023: In the Defense of Liberty (Freehand Press) ISBN 978-1-990601-41-5

== Anthologized ==
- 1971: Instead of Revolution, Howard Reiter, ed., New York, (Hawthorn Books) Chapter Two: "Youth Culture"
- 1985: Vancouver Fiction. David Watmough, ed., Winlaw, B.C., (Polestar Press) ISBN 978-0-919591-05-9
- 1986: Magic Realism and Canadian Literature: Essays and Stories, Proceedings of the Conference on Magic Realist Writing in Canada. University of Waterloo/Wilfrid Laurier University, May 1985; Peter and Ed Jewinski, eds. (University of Waterloo Press) ISBN 978-0-88898-065-6
- 1992: Silence Made Visible: Howard O'Hagan and John Tay, Margery Fee, ed., Toronto (ECW Press) ISBN 9781550221671
- 1999: New Expansive Poetry. R.S. Gwynn, ed., Ashland, Oregon, (Story Line Press) ISBN 978-1-885266-69-9
- 2005: Wild Sweet Notes II: More Great Poetry From West Virginia. (Publishers Place) ISBN 978-0-9744785-2-4
- 2008: The Best of Canadian Poetry in English, 2008. Stephanie Bolster and Molly Peacock, eds., (Tightrope Books) ISBN 978-0-9783351-7-5
- 2008: Crossing Lines: Poets Who Came to Canada in the Vietnam War. Allan Briesmaster and Steven Michael Berzensky, eds., (Seraphim Editions) ISBN 978-0-9808879-1-4
- 2014: Naked in Academe: Celebrating Fifty Years of Creative Writing at UBC. Rhea Tregebov, ed., (McClelland & Stewart) ISBN 978-0-7710-8926-8
- 2018: Refuse: Canlit in Ruins. Hannah McGregor, Julie Rak & Erin Wunker, eds., (Book*hug) ISBN 978-1-7716643-1-8
