= Romance on Film, Romance on Broadway =

Studio album by Michael Feinstein
- Released: October 10, 2000
- Recorded: 2000
- Genre: Vocal jazz
- Length: 57:14
- Label: Concord

Michael Feinstein chronology
Big City Rhythms (1999)	Romance on Film, Romance on Broadway (2000)	Michael Feinstein with the Israel Philharmonic Orchestra (2001)

Romance on Film, Romance on Broadway is a 2000 album by American vocalist Michael Feinstein arranged by Alan Broadbent and John Oddo. It was Feinstein's third album for the Concord label.

== Reception ==
The Allmusic review by Scott Yanow awarded the album four and a half stars and said "Feinstein's voice is alluring, sophisticated, and comfortable on this excellent collection of popular music that he interprets in so many heartfelt ways...Michael Feinstein takes these songs to a different time and space that is sure to keep lovers of romantic ballads happy for some time to come"

Professional ratings
Review scores
Source	Rating
Allmusic	4.5/5 stars

== Track listing ==
Disc One

1. "The More I See You" (Mack Gordon, Harry Warren) - 6:16
2. "The Second Time Around" (Sammy Cahn, Jimmy Van Heusen) - 5:32
3. "As Time Goes By" (Hermann Hupfeld) - 6:28
4. "Isn't It Romantic?" (Lorenz Hart, Richard Rodgers) - 4:44
5. "All the Way" (Cahn, Van Heusen) - 5:18
6. "Something's Gotta Give" (Johnny Mercer) - 5:06
7. "The Way You Look Tonight" (Dorothy Fields, Jerome Kern) - 7:28
8. "Long Ago (and Far Away)" (Ira Gershwin, Kern) - 5:39
9. "When I Fall in Love"/"My Foolish Heart" (Edward Heyman, Victor Young)/(Ned Washington, Young) - 6:24
10. "How Do You Keep the Music Playing?" (Alan Bergman, Marilyn Bergman, Michel Legrand) - 5:23

Disc Two

1. "Always" (Irving Berlin) - 6:07
2. "I've Grown Accustomed to Her Face" (Alan Jay Lerner, Frederick Loewe) - 5:08
3. "If This Isn't Love" (Yip Harburg, Burton Lane) - 3:41
4. "They Say It's Wonderful" (Berlin) - 4:23
5. "I've Never Been in Love Before" (Frank Loesser) - 2:56
6. "As Long as She Needs Me" (Lionel Bart) - 4:40
7. "The Song Is You" (Oscar Hammerstein II, Kern) - 4:15
8. "Darn That Dream" (Eddie DeLange, Van Heusen) - 5:59
9. "The Best Things in Life Are Free" (Lew Brown, Buddy DeSylva, Ray Henderson) - 4:49
10. "My Funny Valentine" (Hart, Rodgers) - 5:01
11. "Taking a Chance on Love" (Vernon Duke, Ted Fetter, John La Touche) - 4:01
12. "Ev'ry Time We Say Goodbye" (Cole Porter) - 4:03

== Personnel ==
- Michael Feinstein - vocals, piano, liner notes
- Alan Broadbent - arranger, piano
- John Oddo
- Chuck Berghofer - double bass
- Jay Leonhart
- Mark Vinci - clarinet, flute, tenor saxophone
- Joe Cocuzzo - drums
- George Rabbai - flugelhorn, trumpet
- Bucky Pizzarelli - guitar
- Marian McPartland - piano
- Dan Block - alto saxophone
- Gary Foster

Production

- Leslie Ann Jones - engineer, mixing, producer
- John Burk - executive producer
- Allen Sviridoff - producer
