= Pure Gershwin =

Studio album by Michael Feinstein
- Released: April 28, 1987
- Recorded: 1985
- Genre: Vocal jazz
- Length: 54:58
- Label: Asylum

Michael Feinstein chronology
| Live at the Algonquin (1986) | Pure Gershwin (1987) | Remember: Michael Feinstein Sings Irving Berlin (1987) |

Pure Gershwin is an album by American vocalist Michael Feinstein of songs composed by George Gershwin. This was Feinstein's debut studio recording, originally released on the Parnassus label in 1985.

It was Feinstein's first album of Gershwin's music, his two other all-Gershwin albums are Nice Work If You Can Get It: Songs by the Gershwins (1996) and Michael & George: Feinstein Sings Gershwin (1998).

== Reception ==
Professional ratings
Review scores
| Source | Rating |
|---|---|
| Allmusic | 4.5/5 stars |

The Allmusic review by William Ruhlmann awarded the album four ½ stars and said Feinstein's reading of Gershwin was "near perfect", and his piano playing excellent.

== Track listing ==
1. "'S Wonderful" - 3:54
2. "Love Is Here to Stay" - 3:53
3. "Liza (All the Clouds'll Roll Away)" - 5:24
4. "The World Is Mine" - 2:56
5. "They Can't Take That Away from Me" - 3:36
6. "Isn't It a Pity?" - 7:03
7. "Let's Call the Whole Thing Off" - 2:43
8. "Embraceable You" - 4:33
9. "What Causes That?" - 3:19
10. "He Loves and She Loves"/"How Long Has This Been Going On?" - 5:49
11. "They All Laughed" - 3:03
12. "The Girl I Love" - 4:30
13. "Someone to Watch over Me" - 4:15

All music composed by George Gershwin, and all lyrics written by Ira Gershwin, additionally Gus Kahn provides lyrics on "Liza (All the Clouds'll Roll Away)"

== Personnel ==
- Michael Feinstein - vocals, piano
- Ted Hawke - drums
- Jim Hughart - double bass
- David Ross - piano
- Morgan Ames - liner notes
- Herb Eiseman - producer
- Dennis Sands - engineer
- Rosemary Clooney - singing, Isn't It a Pity?
