= Ferron (album) =

Studio album by Ferron
- Released: 1977
- Genre: Folk
- Label: Lucy Records
- Producer: Ferron

Ferron chronology
Ferron (1977)	Backed Up (1978)

Ferron is the debut album by Canadian singer-songwriter Ferron. It was self-produced and released in March 1977 by independent label Lucy Records and subsequently distributed by Ladyslipper Music.

== Track listing ==
All songs written by Ferron.

1. "O Baby"
2. "Slender Wet Branches"
3. "Who Loses"
4. "Dead Men and Lovers"
5. "Rollspin"
6. "Under the Weather"
7. "Fly on the Nose"
8. "Just the Wind"
9. "Luckie"
10. "Bourbon Street Vision"
11. "I Am Hungry (How Are You)"
12. "Borderlines"
13. "Freedom"
14. "In Retrospect"
15. "Windblown Leaf"

== Production and release ==
Ferron was the first album released by Ferron, on her own label Lucy Records. A self-taught artist, she began writing songs in earnest at age 19. Six years later, she had amassed a body of work comprising her first two albums.

Recorded on a two-track tape machine at a Vancouver television studio, the album was mixed with minimal processing except for some equalization and peak limiting. She rehearsed at the studio for a week, and then recorded the entire album in one thirteen hour session. Sound engineering and cover art were both donated by friends.

Of "Who Loses", she told writer Keith Maillard that "People always think it's a lesbian love song. And it is...but when I wrote it, there wasn't any Louise in my life, I had to make her up. And she was me too, of course; she was my struggle against letting myself be what I was." Maillard observed that the early influence of country-western music evolved into a contemporary urban folk style, moving from flat-picking to fingerpicked songs, exemplified by the tracks "Under the Weather" and "Dead Men and Lovers."

"I think when women are alone together...we sing to comfort each other. But I've been hearing my voice come back to me, and it sounds angry," she said at a concert later that year. "Well, I am angry. I'm angry at a world that won't let me be what I want to be...and I think it's good that you should hear it."

The production cost $3,000. Only 1,000 copies were pressed, due to the cost. A year later, only two hundred copies were left. By the end of 1979, all copies were reportedly sold.

Although the album has never been re-released, a number of songs were recorded again on subsequent albums: "Who Loses" and "O Baby" appear on 1980's Testimony, "I Am Hungry" was re-recorded for Still Riot, "Borderlines" appears on Driver and a vintage recording of "Slender Wet Branches" was released on 2013's Thunder & Lighten-ing. 1992's live concert album Not A Still Life features a number of early songs, including "Who Loses" and "I Am Hungry." It closes with "Fly on My Nose" (re-titled "Wind's All a Whisper").

== Critical reception ==
"...a strong and beautiful debut," according to The Vancouver Sun. "The songs, though more from the heart than the intellect, still rustle with the strong imagery of a deep and elusive narrator," remarked Vaughn Palmer a year later. "And the music is memorable. You find yourself humming such cuts as Bourbon Street Vision, Freedom, Rollspin or I Am Hungry after only a few listenings."

"Simply produced--Ferron's voice & guitar--but there's nothing simple about the music," according to Ladyslipper Music. "With her deep clear voice & unique singing-talking style, Ferron creates a sound that moves into your body & holds you. Her talents as a musician & lyricist/ poet round out the album."

"The record is a stunning achievement," said writer and future collaborator Keith Maillard, writing in 1977. "The fifteen songs are a well-chosen sample of her material, her earliest to her most recent; both her vocal and guitar work sound assured and authoritative, and she projects her poetry with warmth and immediacy as though singing to friends...Ferron may just turn out to be one of the best and most important songwriters in North America."

== Personnel ==
=== Musicians ===
- Ferron − guitar and vocals

=== Technical ===
- Rob Linschoten − Engineering
- Design - Shelly Hammer
- Illustration − Judi Saltman
- Photography − Nina Boax
