= The Detska Kitka Choir =

Bulgarian girls' choir

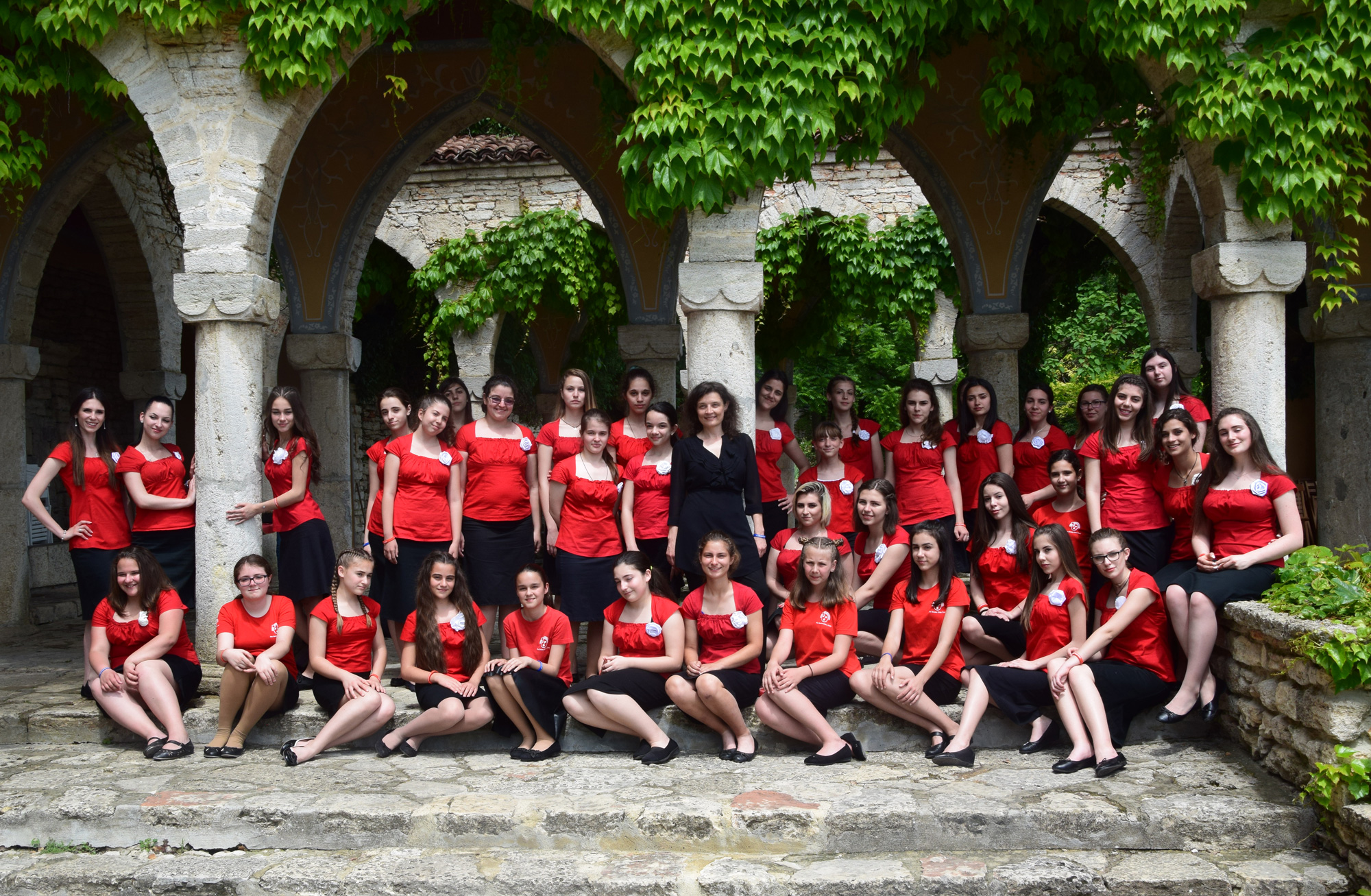
The Detska Kitka choir in Balchik, 2017

The Detska Kitka Choir is a girls’ choir based in Plovdiv, Bulgaria.

== Biography ==
Founded in 1947 by Anastas Marinkev, the Detska Kitka Choir is one of the oldest and best known youth choirs in Bulgaria.

The choir acquired its international reputation in the 80's and 90's under the leadership of Prof. Zlatina Deliradeva, when it won a series of awards from the international choral competitions in Celje (Slovenia), Debrezen (Hungary), Arnhem (the Netherlands), Varna (Bulgaria), Cantonigros (Spain), Halle (Germany) and Maasmechelen (Belgium).

In 2002 Yana Deliradeva joined The "Detska Kitka" choir as an assistant conductor, and since 2011 she has been directing most of its concert performances.

In 2006 Detska Kitka won the Grand Prix of the International Festival of Advent and Christmas Music of Prague (Czech Republic).

In 2013, under the leadership of Yana Deliradeva, the choir won a Silver Medal and the Best Performance of a Work Composed after 1990 Award of the International Youth Choir Festival of Celje, Slovenia.

Detska Kitka tours internationally once, sometimes twice a year, and has appeared in Austria, Belgium, Bosnia and Herzegovina, the Czech Republic, France, Germany, Greece, Hungary, Italy, the Netherlands, Poland, Slovenia, Spain, and Turkey. Since the 1970s the group has delivered more than 900 performances on Bulgarian and international stage and participated in numerous international music festivals. It is a three-time participant in the cultural programmes of the Council of Europe’s Parliamentary Assembly and the European Parliament in Strasbourg.

The group's recent international appearances include a concert tour of Belgium, Germany and the Netherlands (2008), and performances at the International Choir Festival of St. Petersburg (2009), the Asturias Joven Youth Choir Festival, Spain (2010), the International Habaneras and Polyphony Contest in Torrevieja, Spain (2011), the Moscow Easter Festival (2012), the International Youth Choir Festival in Celje, Slovenia (2013), and the International Children's Choir Festival in Halle, Germany (2014), International Youth Choir Festival "Let The Future Sing" in Stockholm, Sweden (2015), International Girls' Choir Festival "Trillme" in Poznan, Poland (2016), International Choral Festival "Black Sea Sounds" in Balchik (2017), International Peace Choir Festival in Vienna, Austria (2018) and a Concert tour in Japan (2024).

== Awards and distinctions ==
- Gold Medal at the IX World Peace Choir Festival in Vienna, Austria (2018).
- UBC Award for the best performance of a song by a Bulgarian composer at the VII International Choir Festival "Chernomorski Zvuci" in Balchik (2017)
- 2013 International Youth Choir Festival, Celje, Slovenia, with Yana Deliradeva - Silver Medal, Girls' Choirs and Best Performance of a Work Composed after 1990 Award
- 2006 International Festival of Advent and Christmas Music, Prague, Czech Republic – Winner, Grand Prix; Winner, Children’s Choirs
- 2003 Honorary Sign of the City of Plovdiv
- 1999 International Choir Competition of Flanders, Maasmechelen, Belgium – 3rd Prize, Women’s Choirs
- 1998 International Choir Competition, Halle, Germany – The Gunter Erdman Special Award for best interpretation of a contemporary choral work
- 1997 The Golden Lyre Award of the Union of Bulgarian Musicians and Dancers
- 1996 The Plovdiv Award for achievement in the field of music
- 1995 International Choir Competition, Cantonigros, Spain – 3rd Prize, Children’s Choirs
- 1989 Prof. Georgi Dimitrov International Choir Competition, Varna, Bulgaria – Winner, Children's Choirs
- 1987 International Choir Competition, Arnhem, Netherlands – 3rd Prize, Children's Choirs
- 1984 Bela Bartok International Choir Competition, Debrecen, Hungary – Winner, Folklore; 2nd Prize, Contemporary Music
- 1981 International Choir Competition, Celje, Slovenia - Winner, Children's Choirs

== Leadership ==
The choir is currently led by: Zlatina Deliradeva, principal conductor; Yana Deliradeva, conductor; Nikolina Kurmazliyska, junior choir conductor / vocal coach, Dzhulia Uzunova junior choir conductor / vocal coach and Sonya Zapryanova, accompanist / vocal coach.
