= Michael Feinstein with the Israel Philharmonic Orchestra =

Studio album by Michael Feinstein
- Released: October 9, 2001
- Recorded: March 7–11, 2001
- Genre: Vocal jazz
- Length: 57:14
- Label: Concord

Michael Feinstein chronology
Romance on Film, Romance on Broadway (2000)	Michael Feinstein with the Israel Philharmonic Orchestra (2001)	Livingston and Evans Songbook featuring Michael Feinstein (2002)

Michael Feinstein with the Israel Philharmonic Orchestra is a 2001 album by American vocalist Michael Feinstein accompanied by the Israel Philharmonic Orchestra, with arrangements by Alan Broadbent. It was Feinstein's third album for the Concord label, and his first orchestral recording.

== Reception ==
Professional ratings
Review scores
Source	Rating
Allmusic	4/5 stars

The Allmusic review by Stephen Thomas Erlewine awarded the album 4 stars and said the album "comes across as a slyly romantic, lightly swinging big band session", he also praised Feinstein's "classy, understated delivery and the skillful arrangements of Broadbent".

== Track listing ==
1. "The Folks Who Live On the Hill" (Oscar Hammerstein II, Jerome Kern) - 6:09
2. "The Best Is Yet to Come" (Cy Coleman, Carolyn Leigh) - 3:01
3. "Guess I'll Hang My Tears Out to Dry" (Sammy Cahn, Jule Styne) - 4:47
4. "By Myself" (Howard Dietz, Arthur Schwartz) - 4:11
5. "Spring Will Be a Little Late This Year" (Frank Loesser) - 5:41
6. "Stormy Weather" (Harold Arlen, Ted Koehler) - 5:25
7. "Laura" (Johnny Mercer, David Raksin) - 5:40
8. "On a Clear Day (You Can See Forever)" (Burton Lane, Alan Jay Lerner) - 2:38
9. "Love Is Here to Stay" (George Gershwin, Ira Gershwin) - 5:56
10. "How Deep Is the Ocean?" (Irving Berlin) - 4:45
11. "Somewhere" (Leonard Bernstein, Stephen Sondheim) - 5:36
12. "I Won't Send Roses" (Jerry Herman) - 3:25

- Recorded between May 6–10, 2002.

== Personnel ==
- Michael Feinstein - vocals, piano
- The Israel Philharmonic Orchestra
- Alan Broadbent - arranger, conductor, piano
- Avishai Cohen - double bass
- Albie Berk - drums
