= Nice Work If You Can Get It: Songs by the Gershwins =

Studio album by Michael Feinstein
- Released: February 13, 1996
- Recorded: 1996
- Genre: Vocal jazz
- Length: 54:43
- Label: Atlantic

Michael Feinstein chronology
| Michael Feinstein Sings the Hugh Martin Songbook (1995) | Nice Work If You Can Get It: Songs by the Gershwins (1996) | Nobody But You (1998) |

Nice Work If You Can Get It: Songs by the Gershwins is a 1996 album by American vocalist Michael Feinstein of songs composed by George Gershwin. It was Feinstein's second album of Gershwin's music, following Pure Gershwin (1987) and preceding Michael & George: Feinstein Sings Gershwin (1998).

== Reception ==
Professional ratings
Review scores
| Source | Rating |
|---|---|
| AllMusic | 4.5/5 stars |

The AllMusic review by William Ruhlmann awarded the album 4½ stars and compared the album to Feinstein's earlier all-Gershwin album Pure Gershwin (1987). Feinstein had previously been a secretary to Ira Gershwin, and Ruhlmann remarks that "the man has the heart of a research assistant, but few history lessons are this much fun". Feinstein's research is evident on this album, with debut recordings of the songs "Anything for You" and "Will You Remember Me?".

== Track listing ==
1. "Who Cares?" - 3:37
2. "Ask Me Again" - 3:18
3. "Anything for You" - 2:44
4. "Someone to Watch Over Me" - 4:58
5. "Luckiest Man in the World" - 4:38
6. "Fascinating Rhythm" - 7:29
7. "Will You Remember Me?" - 2:49
8. "Nice Work If You Can Get It" - 3:12
9. "Somebody Stole My Heart Away" - 4:50
10. "A Foggy Day"/"Things Are Looking Up" - 6:23
11. "Love Is in the Air" - 3:28
12. "They Can't Take That Away from Me" - 5:30
13. "For You, for Me, for Evermore" - 3:55

All music composed by George Gershwin, and all lyrics written by Ira Gershwin.

== Personnel ==
- Michael Feinstein - vocals, arranger, piano, liner notes

== Charts ==
| Chart (1996) | Peak position |
|---|---|
| Australian Albums (ARIA Charts) | 74 |
