= Novi Novog =

American violist

- Born: 1949 (age 76–77)
- Origin: North Hollywood, California, United States
- Genre: Rock
- Occupation: Musician
- Instruments: Viola; violin; keyboards; vocals

Ilene Novog, known professionally as Novi Novog, is an American violist. She is sometimes simply credited as "Novi" and is a cousin of Lauren Wood (also known as "Chunky"). In 1973, Novi became one of three members of her cousin's band Chunky, Novi and Ernie with the bassist Ernie Eremita (April 15, 2018). She played strings on "Purple Rain" alongside Suzie Katayama.

== Discography ==
=== Albums (with band) ===
- Chunky, Novi & Ernie (1973)
- Chunky, Novi & Ernie (1977)

=== Session work ===
- Doobie Brothers - What Were Once Vices Are Now Habits (1974) viola on "Black Water" and "Spirit"
- Montrose - Warner Brothers Presents... Montrose! (1975) viola on "Whaler"
- Carly Simon - Another Passenger - (1976) viola
- Doobie Brothers - Takin' It to the Streets (1976) viola
- Doobie Brothers - Minute by Minute Open Your Eyes (1978) synthesizer
- Lauren Wood - Lauren Wood (1979) viola, synthesizer
- Tom Johnston - Still Feels Good (1981) viola
- Sheila E. - The Glamorous Life (1984) violin
- The Time - Ice Cream Castle (1984) violin
- Prince & the Revolution - Purple Rain (1984) violin, viola
- Prince & the Revolution - Around the World in a Day (1985) violin
- Jennifer Warnes - Famous Blue Raincoat (1986) viola
- 10,000 Maniacs - In My Tribe (1987) viola
- Bonnie Raitt - Luck of the Draw (1991) viola
- Christopher Cross - Rendezvous (1993) viola
- Ferron - Driver - (1994) viola
- David Arkenstone - Another Star in the Sky (1995) viola on "Voices of the Night". and "Canyon of the Moon"
- Freeway Philharmonic - Road to Joy (1995) viola
- Freeway Philharmonic - Sonic Detour (1995) viola
- Valerie Carter - The Way It Is (1996) viola
- Lauren Wood - Lauren Wood (1997)
- Scott Weiland - 12 Bar Blues (1998) viola
- Marianne Faithfull - Vagabond Ways (1999) viola
- Michael Jackson - Invincible (2001) viola, contractor
- León Gieco - Bandidos rurales (2001) viola
- Frank Zappa - Joe's Camouflage (2014) viola, keyboards, vocals (June 1975-September 1975 The Mothers of Invention rehearsal recordings)
