= Michael Feinstein =

American musician (born 1956)

- Feinstein performing at Feinstein's/54 Below in New York City, June 2017

Background information
- Born: Michael Jay Feinstein; September 7, 1956 (age 70); Columbus, Ohio, U.S.
- Genre: The Great American Songbook
- Occupations: Singer, pianist, music archivist
- Instruments: Vocals, piano
- Years active: 1977–present
- Labels: Nonesuch/Elektra Records, Concord Records
- Spouse: Terrence Flannery
- Website: michaelfeinstein.com

Michael Jay Feinstein (born September 7, 1956) is an American singer, pianist, and music revivalist. He is an archivist and interpreter for the repertoire known as the Great American Songbook. In 1988, he won a Drama Desk Special Award for celebrating American musical theater songs. Feinstein is a five-time Grammy-nominated recording artist. He is the founder of the Great American Songbook Foundation and the artistic director for Allied Solutions Center for the Performing Arts in Carmel, Indiana.

== Early life ==
Feinstein was born in Columbus, Ohio, the son of Florence Mazie (née Cohen), an amateur tap dancer, and Edward Feinstein, a sales executive for the Sara Lee Corporation and a former amateur singer. He is Jewish. At the age of five, he had piano lessons for six weeks until his tutor realised he was playing by ear instead of reading the sheet music. He quit lessons, thereafter taught himself.

== Career ==
After graduating from high school, Feinstein worked in local piano bars for two years, moving to Los Angeles when he was 20. Through the widow of concert pianist and actor Oscar Levant, he was introduced in 1977 to Ira Gershwin, who hired him to catalog his extensive collection of phonograph records. The assignment led to six years of researching, cataloging, and preserving the unpublished sheet music and rare recordings in Gershwin's home, Ira's works but also those of Ira's brother, composer George Gershwin. During Feinstein's years with Ira Gershwin, he also got to know Gershwin's next-door neighbor, singer Rosemary Clooney, with whom Feinstein formed a friendship lasting until Clooney's death. Feinstein served as musical consultant for the 1983 Broadway show My One and Only, a musical pastiche of Gershwin tunes.

By the mid-1980s, Feinstein was a nationally known cabaret singer-pianist famed for being a proponent of the Great American Songbook. In 1986, he recorded his first CD, Pure Gershwin (1987), a collection of music by George and Ira Gershwin. That was followed by Live at the Algonquin (1986); Remember: Michael Feinstein Sings Irving Berlin (1987); Isn't It Romantic (1988), a collection of standards and his first album backed by an orchestra; and Over There (1989), featuring the music of America and Europe during World War I. Feinstein recorded Pure Imagination, his only children's album, in 1992. In the 1987 episode "But Not for Me" of the TV series thirtysomething, he sang "But Not for Me", "Love Is Here to Stay," and Isn't It Romantic?.

By 1988, Feinstein was starring on Broadway in a series of in-concert shows: Michael Feinstein in Concert (April through June 1988), Michael Feinstein in Concert: "Isn't It Romantic" (October through November 1988), and Michael Feinstein in Concert: Piano and Voice (October 1990). He returned to Broadway in 2010, in a concert special duo with Dame Edna titled All About Me (March through April 2010). In 1991 his persona as a cabaret performer was parodied in the third season of Mystery Science Theater 3000, which covered the Kaiju movie Gamera vs. Guiron. At the episode's close, Feinstein, played by the show's head writer Michael J. Nelson, sang a cabaret version of the Gamera theme song to the characters Dr. Clayton Forrester and TV's Frank.

In the early 1990s, Feinstein embarked on a songbook project where he performed an album featuring the music of a featured composer, often accompanied by the composer. They included collaborations with Burton Lane (two volumes: 1990, 1992), Jule Styne (1991), Jerry Herman (Michael Feinstein Sings the Jerry Herman Songbook, 1993), Hugh Martin (1995), Jimmy Webb (Only One Life: The Songs of Jimmy Webb, 2003) and Jay Livingston/Ray Evans (2002). Feinstein also recorded three albums of standards with Maynard Ferguson: Forever (1993), Such Sweet Sorrow (1995), and Big City Rhythms (1999).

In the late 1990s, Feinstein recorded two more albums of Gershwin music: Nice Work If You Can Get It: Songs by the Gershwins (1996) and Michael & George: Feinstein Sings Gershwin (1998). His albums in the 21st century include Romance on Film, Romance on Broadway (2000), Michael Feinstein with the Israel Philharmonic Orchestra (2001), Hopeless Romantics (2005, featuring George Shearing), and The Sinatra Project (2008).

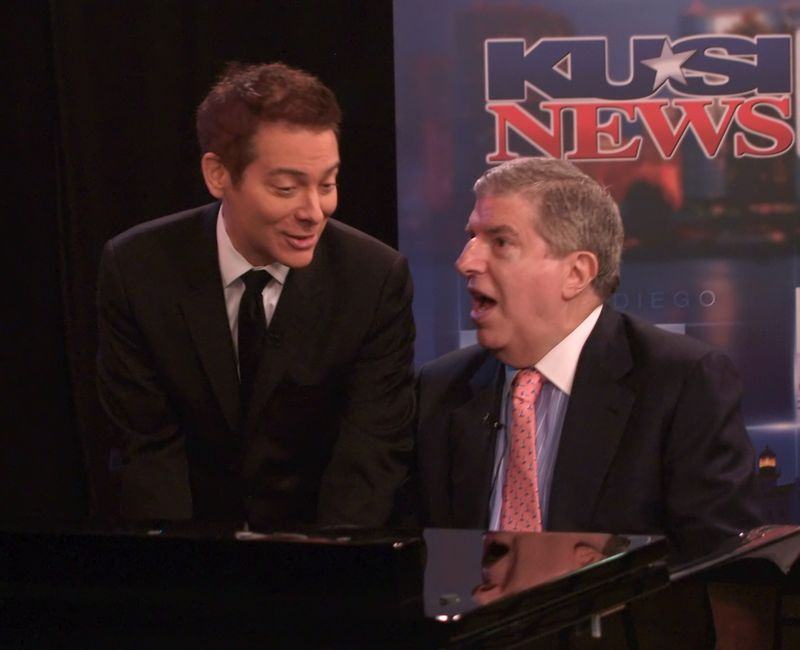
Michael Feinstein and Marvin Hamlisch performing a duet of Cole Porter's "Anything Goes," in April 2009.

== Impact and legacy ==
In 2000, the Library of Congress appointed Feinstein to the National Recording Preservation Board, an organization dedicated to safeguarding America's musical heritage. In 2009, Feinstein became the artistic director of Allied Solutions Center for the Performing Arts.

Feinstein teamed with Cheyenne Jackson in 2009 to create a nightclub act titled "The Power of Two". The show was hailed by The New York Times as "passionate", "impeccably harmonized" and "groundbreaking". Variety acclaimed it as "dazzlingly entertaining". Their act became one of the most critically acclaimed shows of 2009, and the duo created a studio album from the material, titled The Power of Two, and it included their cover of the Indigo Girls song of the same name.

In 2010, PBS aired Michael Feinstein's American Songbook, a three-part television documentary which depicts the history of the American popular song up to 1960 as well as Feinstein's own life and career. Feinstein has written the score for two stage musicals, The Night They Saved Macy's Parade and The Gold Room.

His Manhattan nightclub, Feinstein's at Loews Regency New York, presented the top talent of pop and jazz from 1999 to 2012, including Rosemary Clooney, Liza Minnelli, Glen Campbell, Barbara Cook, Diahann Carroll, Jane Krakowski, Lea Michele, Cyndi Lauper, Jason Mraz, and Alan Cumming. The club was closed in December 2012 due to a year-long renovation of the entire Regency Hotel. Feinstein opened the nightclub Feinstein's at the Nikko at the Nikko Hotel in San Francisco in May 2013. In 2015, he entered into a creative partnership with the founders of 54 Below, located in the basement of New York's Studio 54, and they rebranded the nightclub as Feinstein's/54 Below until their partnership ended in 2022.

From 2012 to 2015, Feinstein was the host of the weekly, one-hour radio program Song Travels with Michael Feinstein, produced by South Carolina ETV Radio and distributed by NPR. On the program, Feinstein explored the legendary songs of 20th century America. The series surveys the passage of American popular song throughout the American landscape, evolving with each artist and performance.

Feinstein was named Principal Pops Conductor for the Pasadena POPS in 2012 and made his conducting debut in June 2013. In 2016, Feinstein's contract with the Pasadena POPS was extended through 2019. Feinstein's memoir The Gershwins and Me: A Personal History in Twelve Songs about working for Ira Gershwin was published in Fall 2012, accompanied by a CD of Feinstein's performing the Gershwin brothers' music discussed in the book. In April 2013, Feinstein released Change Of Heart: The Songs of André Previn, (Concord) in collaboration with composer-conductor-pianist André Previn, with an album celebrating Previn's repertoire from his catalog of pop songs which have most commonly been featured in motion pictures. The album's first song is "(You've Had) a Change of Heart".

On October 31, 2014, Feinstein's Michael Feinstein at the Rainbow Room premiered on PBS, with guest stars. The special is part of the 2014 PBS Arts Fall Festival, a primetime program with 11 weekly programs of classic Broadway hits and music as well as some award-winning theater performances. Feinstein has appeared numerous times as a presenter on Turner Classic Movies. After cohosting with Robert Osborne for a night in January 2015, he returned to the channel as a guest host in August 2016 and December 2017.

=== Great American Songbook Foundation ===
Feinstein founded the Great American Songbook Foundation, first named the Michael Feinstein Initiative, in 2007. Today, the Songbook Foundation is housed in The Palladium at Allied Solutions Center for the Performing Arts in Carmel, Indiana. The organization is dedicated to the preservation, research, and exhibition of the physical artifacts of the Great American Songbook and educating about the music's relevance to contemporary culture. The organization maintains an archive and reference library and a rotating exhibit gallery, and announced in 2023 the plan to build a free-standing museum on a 3.7-acre site north of its current location.

Feinstein has been a guest mentor of the Songbook Academy since its inception in 2009. The summer music intensive is hosted annually by the Great American Songbook Foundation and immerses high school students in America's musical heritage and fosters artistic identity through song. Feinstein is a contributor to the Songbook Library & Archives, which houses several archival collections of sheet music, musical arrangements, books, LPs and other music recording formats, memorabilia, photographs, videos, documents, and more.

Since 2021, the Songbook Foundation publishes a web series titled "In the Archives with Michael Feinstein," where Feinstein hosts behind-the-scenes discussions with celebrity guests and archival experts about artifacts and collections housed in the Songbook Library & Archives.

== Personal life ==
In October 2008, Feinstein married his longtime partner Terrence Flannery. The ceremony was performed by family court and television judge Judith Sheindlin, also known as Judge Judy.
