= Ferron =

Canadian musician and singer-songwriter

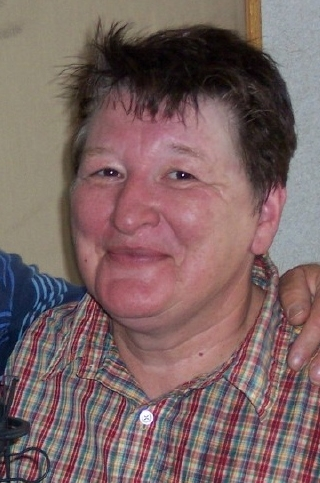

Background information
- Born: Deborah Foisy; 1 June 1952 (age 74); Toronto, Ontario, Canada
- Genres: Singer-songwriter, folk music, women's music
- Occupations: Songwriter, musician, poet
- Instruments: Vocals, guitar
- Years active: 1975–present
- Website: ferronsongs.com

Ferron Foisy (born Deborah Foisy on 1 June 1952; known professionally as Ferron) is a Canadian singer-songwriter and poet. In addition to gaining fame as one of Canada's most respected songwriters, Ferron, who is openly lesbian, became one of the earliest and most influential lyrical songwriters of the women's music circuit, and an important influence on later musicians such as Ani DiFranco, Mary Gauthier and the Indigo Girls. From the mid-eighties on, Ferron's songwriting talents have been recognized and appreciated by music critics and broader audiences, with comparisons being made to the writing talents of Van Morrison, Bob Dylan, and Leonard Cohen.

== Early life ==
Born in Toronto and raised around Richmond, British Columbia, Canada, she learned to play guitar at age 11, and left home at 15. Ferron attended Total Ed, an alternative high school in Vancouver, B.C., graduating in 1973. Of her earliest musical memories, she wrote, "my mother's French Canadian family played music. I heard guitars and banjo and accordion and scrub board and my grandfather clogging. I put it together...music meant fun, meant love and laughter. I started writing songs when I was 10, never saved them after some kids at school found them and teased me about it. I wrote songs and remembered them and when I forgot them I felt they were not important anymore. The next time I saved a song I was 18. It was 1970." It was with that first saved song that she made her professional debut in 1975, playing the song "Who Loses" at a benefit for the Women's Press Gang, a Vancouver-based feminist publishing house.

In 1971, Foisy changed her name to Ferron when one of her friends had a dream in which she was called Ferron, which is loosely translated from French meaning iron and rust. Ferron discovered later in her life that she had Métis ancestry. She said in 2017, "My dream is to die a lesbian, First Nations, Canadian."

== 1970s and 1980s ==
While still based in Vancouver, Ferron established her own record label, Lucy Records, and released her self-titled debut album in 1977. The album was recorded in a video studio on two-track equipment, and, as she stated, "the production quality was pretty poor". Nonetheless, all one thousand copies printed sold quickly.

Shortly after her second album Backed Up in 1978, she joined forces with Gayle Scott, who would prove to be her longtime manager, executive producer, and partner in Lucy Records/Penknife Productions, LTD, producing the next two albums and launching concert touring throughout the states. 1980's Testimony was her first professionally produced album, originally distributed through Holly Near's Redwood Records label. Testimony brought her much interest in the United States, particularly in the women's music community. The title song became something of an anthem for many in the women's music community, was notably covered by Sweet Honey in the Rock, and was featured on the second season of The L Word, playing dramatically over the closing credits.

Her 1984 album Shadows on a Dime received a rating of four stars (out of five) from Rolling Stone magazine, which called Ferron "a culture hero" and the album "cowgirl meets Yeats...a thing of beauty." Shadows earned a place on music critic Robert Christgau's "Dean's List" for 1984.

== 1990s and beyond ==
Awarded a Canada Arts Council grant in 1985 to further develop her musicianship, she ended up taking several years off from touring and recording. During this time, she earned some of her living as a carpenter's assistant, bartender, and day care worker, before reinvesting in her music career. Ferron returned to the studio and the road in 1990 with Phantom Center released by Chameleon Records, and produced by Joe Chiccarelli. The album featured backing vocals by a then relatively unknown Tori Amos, and consequently is highly sought after by collectors. Later, in September 1995, Phantom Center would be re-released on EarthBeat! Records with a new recording of the song "Stand Up" backed by the Indigo Girls with their then touring players, bassist Sara Lee and drummer Jerry Marotta.

Between 1992 and 1994, Ferron released three albums on her own Cherrywood Station label (Not a Still Life 1992, Resting with the Question 1992, Driver 1993). The twelve song Driver was first licensed by EarthBeat! Records in 1994, and was highly acclaimed by critics as a masterwork and nominated for a Juno Award in 1995. Following this success, Ferron signed to Warner Bros. enabling her to create Still Riot in the studio with producer db Benedictson for release in the fall of 1996. During her brief tenure with Warner they released Driver as a re-issue, Phantom Center as a re-mixed album, and Still Riot as Ferron's ninth full album project. Initially contracted with Warner for a 7-year, 3-record contract, the deal was terminated early and by 1997 Ferron was back to putting out her own work on the Cherrywood Station label.

In 1996 Ferron received the OUTmusic Award for Lifetime Achievement at the Gay & Lesbian American Music Awards.

For the later half of the nineties, Ferron continued to tour, offer songwriting workshops, and turned her attention back to self-produced projects. As a benefit for the non-profit Institute for Musical Arts (IMA) dedicated to teaching and supporting women and girls in the musical arts, Ferron released Inside Out (1999), covering well-known tunes from the 1950s–1970s. She published a handmade book, THe (h)UNGeR POeMs, while she was teaching classes at IMA. She gathered some of her earlier, then out-of-print recordings to create Impressionistic (2000), a retrospective double album with a 24-page, autobiographical booklet. Her 57-page book, Catching Holy, Poems 2006–2008 was offered by Nemesis Publishing in 2008.

In 2004 she returned to the very island, in British Columbia, where some of her earliest recorded songs were written, to create Turning into Beautiful produced by independent music award-winning Canadian producer db Benedictson. Turning into Beautiful reunited the award-winning musicians from the Driver and Still Riot projects for the release tour. In 2007 she began re-releasing a series of CDs as her Collected Works, and so far Testimony, Driver, Shadows on a Dime, and Turning into Beautiful have appeared completely re-jacketed with previously unreleased photographs.

In 2008, Ferron released Boulder, produced by admirer/musician turned collaborator Bitch (with JD Samson for one song) on the Short Story Records label. Boulder includes guest appearances by Ani DiFranco, Amy Ray and Emily Saliers (Indigo Girls), JD Samson (Le Tigre), Sam Parton (Be Good Tanyas), Tina G (God-des) and Julie Wolf. A CD with live performances, Girl on a Road was released in 2011. Bitch produced the newest Ferron CD Lighten-ing released in 2013 with the film Thunder packaged as a two-disc set.

In addition to her performance career, Ferron has taught master classes in writing in places including Omega Institute, NY, The Rowe Conference Center in Massachusetts, IMA in Bodega, California, and in Provincetown, Massachusetts. She was instrumental in opening up a retreat center near Three Rivers, Michigan called The Fen Peace and Poetry Camp for Women. In 2009 to 2010, Ferron created commissioned textile art—wall hangings, quilts, and pillows—that features her lyrics and poetry. For Ferron, "artistic expression is not only essential, it's revolutionary." "Art is really the expression of the soul," Ferron says. "I'm asking women to remember that if we remember our soul, we keep our soul, and we can do it through artistic connections. Art is connected to the soul, and the soul is connected to God, and God is connected to humility, so if you want to take control of a person's soul, don't let them have art. To me it's a revolutionary act to continue keeping your artist soul alive".

In July 2017, Ferron performed at the 40th annual Vancouver Folk Music Festival at Jericho Beach Park in Vancouver, BC. The Main Stage festival finale was led by Ferron and fellow Canadian singer-songwriter Roy Forbes, with festival artists on stage and the audience singing along to one of Ferron's anthems: "Testimony".

== Discography ==
- Ferron (1977)
- Backed Up (1978)
- Testimony (1980)
- Shadows on a Dime (1984)
- Phantom Center (1990)
- Not a Still Life (1992, live)
- Resting With the Question (1992)
- Driver (1994)
- Still Riot (1996)
- Inside Out (1999)
- Impressionistic (2002, compilation)
- Turning into Beautiful (2005)
- Boulder (2008)
- Girl on a Road (2011, live)
- Lighten-ing (2013)

== Film ==
- 2002: Ferron was featured in Radical Harmonies, a documentary on the history of women's music directed by Dee Mosbacher
- 2009: Ferron: Girl on a Road, a filmography on the musician directed by Gerry Rogers, was released and screened at film festivals and in television broadcast
- 2012: Thunder filmed by Billie Jo Cavallaro and co-directed with Bitch was an Official Selection at the Wild Rose Independent Film Festival in 2013.

== Printed works ==
- Not A Still Life Songbook. (50 pp.; musical notation and lyrics; wire-bound to lay flat.) Nemesis Publishing, Vashon, WA. (1993)
- "Courting the Muse: Thoughts on the Art of Songwriting. Sentimental Education." Sing Out!: The Folk Song Magazine 39(3):55–57. (1994)
- THe (h)UNGeR POeMs. (Printed in two formats: a "bound card" version, and an unbound version consisting of 10 leaves on linen held inside an artisanal envelope of handmade paper; autographed.) Big Universe Productions, Bodega, CA. (1997) (Third edition (2000) )
- Catching Holy. Poems 2006–2008. (57 pp.; perfect binding.) Nemesis Publishing, Three Rivers, MI. (2008)
