= Cheyenne Jackson =

American actor and singer (born 1975)

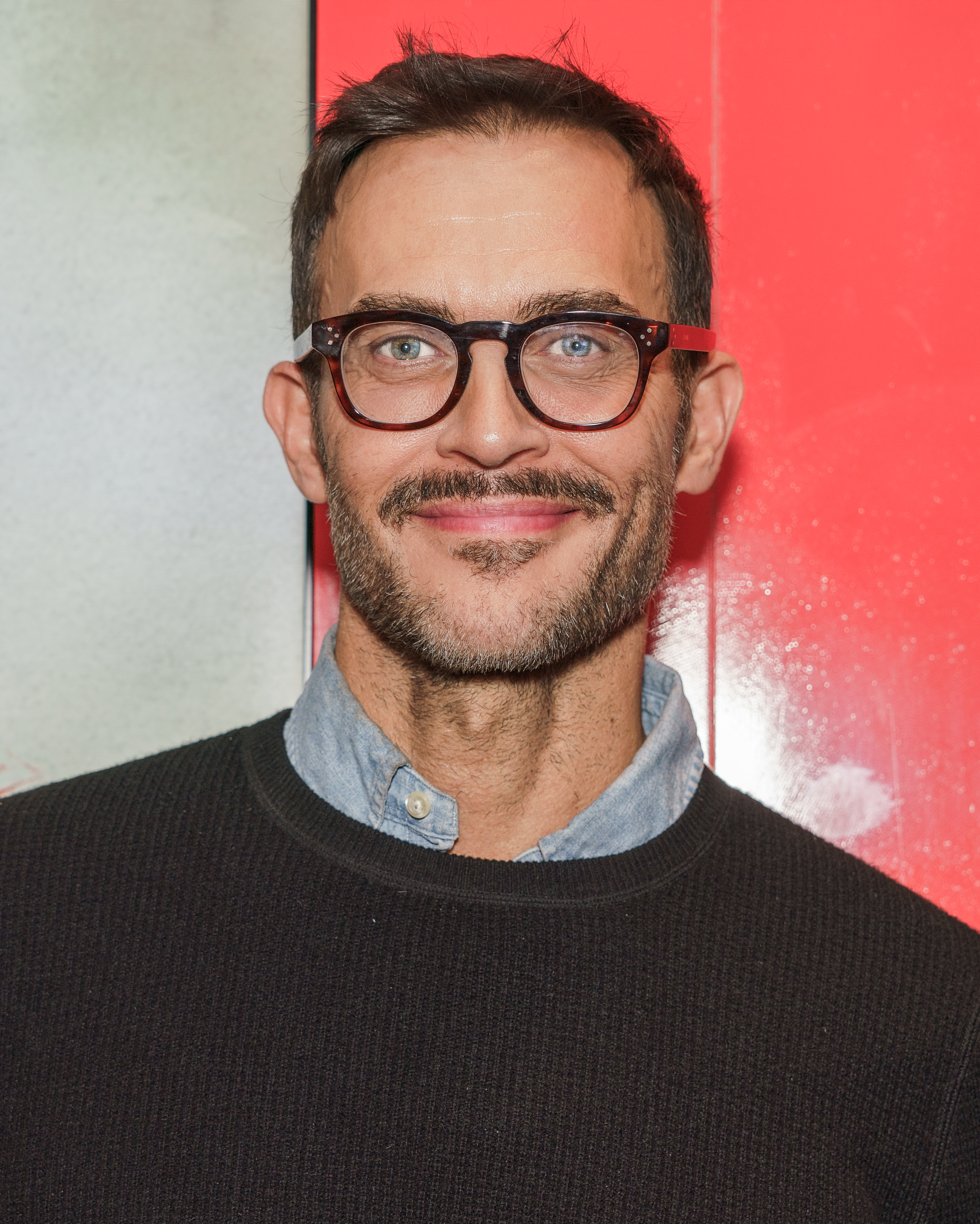
- Jackson in 2025 in New York City
- Born: Cheyenne David Jackson; July 12, 1975 (age 51); Spokane, Washington, U.S.
- Occupations: Actor; singer
- Years active: 2002–present
- Spouses: Monte Lapka (m. 2011; div. 2013) Jason Landau (m. 2014)
- Children: 2

Cheyenne David Jackson (born July 12, 1975) is an American actor and singer. His credits include leading roles in Broadway musicals and other stage roles, as well as film and television roles, concert singing, and music recordings.

After beginning his acting career in regional theatre in Seattle, Washington, Jackson moved to Manhattan and was an understudy in the Broadway productions of Thoroughly Modern Millie (2002) and Aida (2003). He next originated the role of Matthew in the workshop production of Altar Boyz (2004) for the New York Musical Theatre Festival, and was replaced by Scott Porter for the Off-Broadway run. Jackson's first leading role on Broadway was in All Shook Up (2005), which earned him a Theatre World Award for "Outstanding Broadway Debut". Since then, on the New York stage, he has starred in The Agony & the Agony (2006), Xanadu (2007; Drama League, Drama Desk nominations), Damn Yankees (2008), Finian's Rainbow (2010; Drama Desk nomination), 8 (2011), The Heart of the Matter (2012), The Performers (2013), The Secret Garden (2016), Into the Woods (2022), Once Upon a Mattress (2024), and Oh, Mary! (2025–2026).

He has also appeared in a number of films, including the 2006 Academy Award-nominated United 93, in which his portrayal of Mark Bingham earned him the Boston Society of Film Critics 2006 award for Best Ensemble Cast. He also had a leading role in the 2014 independent romantic comedy ensemble, Mutual Friends, and guest roles in television series such as NBC's 30 Rock and Fox's Glee. Beginning in 2015, Jackson starred in the FX horror anthology television series American Horror Story in its fifth, sixth, seventh, and eighth seasons.

In concert, Jackson has sold out Carnegie Hall twice: The Power of Two in 2010 and Music of the Mad Men Era in 2011. He also performs in cabarets. In addition to his Broadway cast albums, he has released three albums of popular music, including a joint album called The Power of Two with Michael Feinstein in 2008. In 2012, Jackson released two singles, "Drive" and "Before You", from his 2013 album I'm Blue, Skies. In 2016, Jackson released his third studio album, Renaissance, an album adapted and expanded from his solo concert Music of the Mad Men Era.

He also stars as Hades in Disney Channel's Descendants 3. In 2020, he reunited with Descendants alumni Kenny Ortega and Booboo Stewart in Netflix's Julie and the Phantoms.

== Early life ==
Jackson was born in Spokane, Washington to David and Sherri Jackson, and was named by his father after the 1950s Western series Cheyenne. The third of four children, he was raised in Oldtown, Idaho, a "teeny mill town" in a rural area in northern Idaho near the Washington border. His father was a Vietnam veteran. His mother taught Jackson, his sister, and his two brothers to sing and regularly played music by Joan Baez, Joni Mitchell, Bob Dylan, and Elvis Presley at home. Throughout his childhood, Jackson lived with his family in a rural home that had an outhouse and no running water. He moved to Spokane as a teenager.

In Seattle, Jackson worked as an ad executive at a magazine and did some theater work on the side, earning his Equity card. He moved to New York City after 2001 to pursue an acting career.

== Career ==
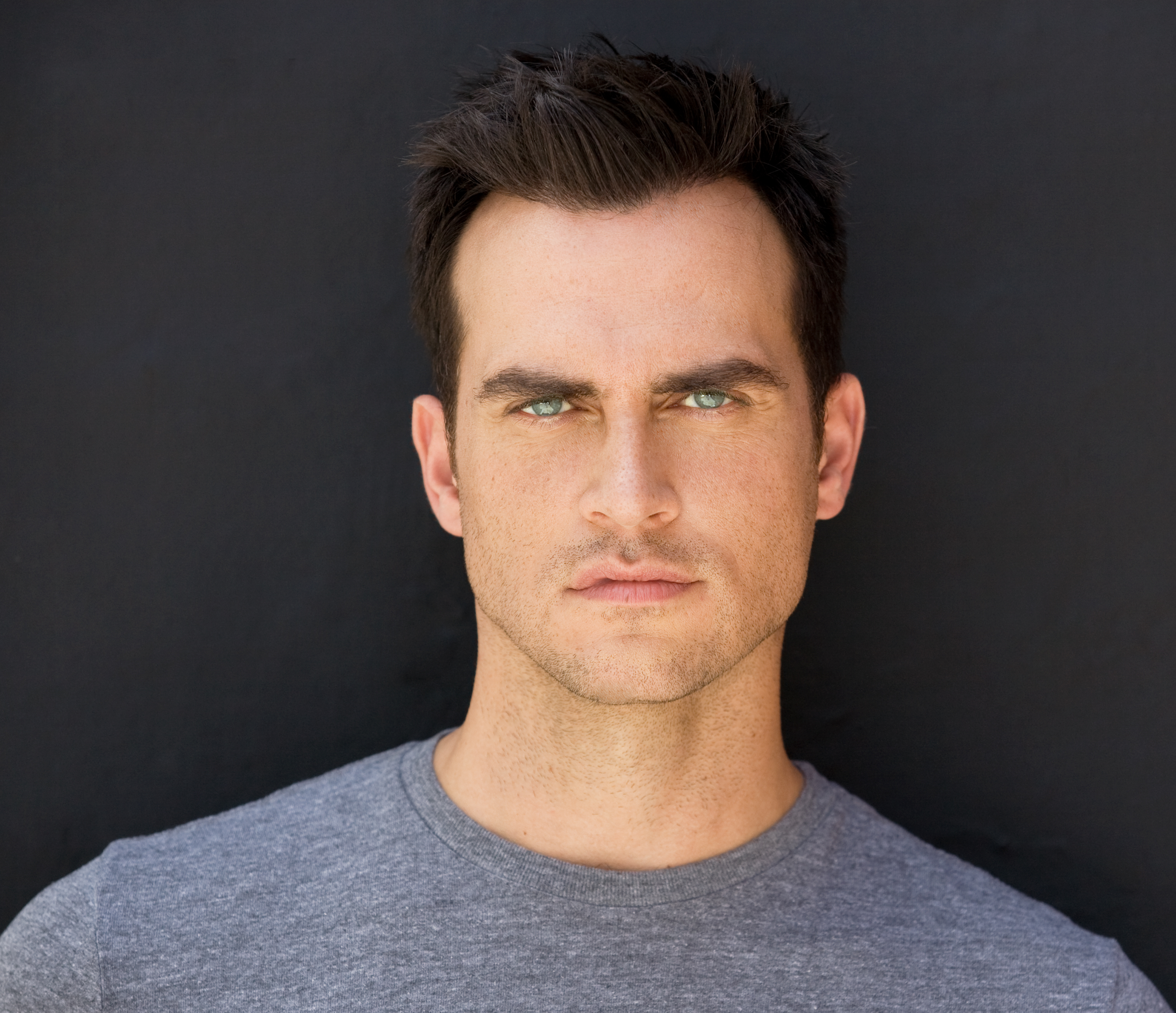
Cheyenne Jackson in 2010

=== Theatrical acting career ===
In regional theaters, Jackson has appeared as Tony in West Side Story, as Joey in The Most Happy Fella, as Cain in Children of Eden, as Berger in Hair, as Billy Bigelow in Carousel, as Joe Hardy in Damn Yankees, as Rocky in The Rocky Horror Show, and as The Poet in Kismet, among many other productions.

Jackson made his Broadway debut understudying both male leads in the Tony Award-winning musical Thoroughly Modern Millie. He later served as the standby for the character of Radames in Aida, then originated the role of Matthew in the NYMF production of Altar Boyz. In 2005, he originated his first Broadway leading role in the musical All Shook Up, a tribute to Elvis Presley. His performance as Chad earned him the Theatre World Award and nominations from the Drama League and Outer Critics Circle Awards for Outstanding Lead Actor. In 2006, Jackson starred off-Broadway in playwright Nicky Silver's The Agony and The Agony with Victoria Clark. In June 2007, less than a week before the scheduled opening night, Jackson assumed the lead role of Sonny on Broadway in Xanadu, replacing James Carpinello who had been injured during rehearsal. Previous workshop productions of the musical starred Jackson and Jane Krakowski. However, both Jackson and Krakowski opted out of the initial Broadway run, citing schedule conflicts. His performance as Sonny earned him nominations from the Drama League and Drama Desk for Outstanding Lead Actor. Xanadu had several Tony Award nominations including "Best New Musical" for which Jackson and the cast performed on the 62nd Tony Awards show.

In 2008, Jackson joined Jane Krakowski and Sean Hayes in the New York City Center's Encores! production of Damn Yankees. He returned to Encores! in 2009, playing Woody Mahoney in a staged concert of Finian's Rainbow. Jackson also starred in the development workshop of The Book of Mormon by Trey Parker, Matt Stone, and Robert Lopez, who co-wrote the music for Avenue Q.

In October 2009, Jackson opened on Broadway reprising the role of Woody Mahoney in the revival of the 1947 musical Finian's Rainbow at the St. James Theatre, costarring with Jim Norton and Kate Baldwin. The Wall Street Journal wrote, "The way that [Kate Baldwin] and Cheyenne Jackson sing "Old Devil Moon" is the stuff best-selling cast albums are made of." The show closed on January 17, 2010. Along with the company of Finian's Rainbow, Jackson recorded the Broadway revival cast album in early December 2009, with a release date of February 2, 2010.

In September 2011, Jackson joined Morgan Freeman, Ellen Barkin, Matt Bomer, Christine Lahti, and John Lithgow as part of the Broadway-premiere cast of Dustin Lance Black's new play 8, directed by Joe Mantello. In June 2012, Jackson starred opposite Krysten Ritter in Neil LaBute's The Heart of The Matter produced by MCC Theater at the Lucille Lortel Theatre.

In the 2012–2013 Broadway season, Jackson, Henry Winkler, Alicia Silverstone, Daniel Breaker, Jenni Barber and Ari Graynor starred in David West Read's play The Performers which started previews on October 23, 2012, at the Longacre Theatre. The play closed on November 18, 2012, after 23 previews and 7 regular performances.

In 2016, Jackson appeared in the 25th Anniversary Concert of The Secret Garden as Dr. Neville Craven at the Lincoln Center.

In 2019, Jackson made his Hollywood Bowl debut playing the roles of the Wolf/Cinderella's Prince in the show Into the Woods opposite Sutton Foster, Sierra Boggess, Patina Miller, Skylar Astin, Chris Carmack, and Shanice Williams. He later reprised these roles while temporarily filling in for Gavin Creel in the 2022 Broadway revival at the St. James Theatre opposite Miller, Sara Bareilles, Brian D'Arcy James, Phillipa Soo, Joshua Henry, and Julia Lester.

In 2024, he portrayed Sir Harry in the New York City Center production of Once Upon A Mattress as a part of its Encores! series. In November, he starred as Georges in the Pasadena Playhouse production of La Cage aux Folles.

In October 2025, he took over the role of Mary's Teacher in Oh, Mary!. He was replaced by Simu Liu in February, 2026. From April 28 to July 5, 2026, Jackson rejoined the Broadway company in the role of Mary's Teacher.

=== Film career ===
In films, Jackson most notably portrayed 9/11 victim and hero Mark Bingham in United 93 which won the Boston Society of Film Critics 2006 award for Best Ensemble Cast. He has also appeared in several other films including: Curiosity (2005), Hysteria (2010), Smile (2011), the critically lauded The Green (opposite Julia Ormond and Illeana Douglas), and 2012 Sundance Film Festival selection Price Check (with Parker Posey). He portrayed Greta Gerwig's boyfriend Roger in the 2012 Fox Searchlight Pictures film Lola Versus. In 2013, he starred in the HBO biopic of Liberace, Behind the Candelabra, with Michael Douglas and Matt Damon. He also appeared in the independent films Mutual Friends (2013), Lucky Stiff (2014), and A Beautiful Now (2015). More recently, he played Hades in the Disney Channel original movie Descendants 3 (2019).

Jackson had a lead role in the film version of Six Dance Lessons in Six Weeks in 2014. He played Michael Minetti, who is hired by retiree Lily Harrison (Gena Rowlands) to give her private dance lessons at her home for six weeks. The film is based on Richard Alfieri's Broadway play of the same name and is directed by Arthur Allan Seidelman.

=== Television career ===
From 2009 through 2013, Jackson had a recurring role on the award-winning series 30 Rock playing Danny Baker. Jackson also portrayed Dustin Goolsby, the coach of "Vocal Adrenaline", the main rival of "New Directions", on the second season of FOX's show Glee.

He has guest starred on several television series, including Lipstick Jungle, Life on Mars, and Ugly Betty, and was featured in a prominent guest role during Season 8 of Curb Your Enthusiasm. His character "Terry" was the personal trainer to Larry David and Wanda Sykes. On March 15, 2010, Jackson made his guest-starring debut on the NBC series Law & Order in an episode entitled "Innocence".

In 2008, Jackson played series lead Sebastian Kinglare for the Lifetime Television pilot Family Practice opposite Anne Archer and Beau Bridges. The series was not picked up for distribution.

In 2010, Jackson filmed a sitcom pilot for ABC-TV called It Takes a Village, co-starring Leah Remini, which was not picked up for the fall 2010 season.

In 2012, Jackson and Nathan Lane were cast as series leads in the USA Network comedy pilot Local Talent. The series was not picked up for distribution.

Additionally, Jackson guest starred on the pilot episode of NBC's revamp of The Munsters, Mockingbird Lane, written by Bryan Fuller and directed by Bryan Singer. Jackson portrayed Scout Master Steve, a competing love interest for Portia de Rossi's character Lily Munster; the show also stars Eddie Izzard and Jerry O'Connell. NBC aired the pilot as a Halloween special on October 26, 2012.

Jackson also appeared in the fifth season of American Horror Story as one of the leads alongside Lady Gaga and Matt Bomer. Jackson returned to the show's sixth season to play Network Executive Sidney Aaron James as well as the seventh season to play psychiatrist Dr. Rudy Vincent Anderson and the eighth season of the show to play warlock John Henry Moore.

Jackson made several appearances on RuPaul's Drag Race. He also appeared in the tenth episode of Season 2 of Sense8 as Blake Huntington, an award-winning actor who is cast opposite Miguel Ángel Silvestre's Lito Rodríguez in a Hollywood film. In 2019, he played the role of Hades, Mal's father in the Disney Channel Original Movie Descendants 3.

Jackson has starred in several notable webisode series including Cubby Bernstein opposite Nathan Lane, Legally Brown with Allison Janney, and The [title of show] Show from the meta-fictional Broadway musical [Title of Show].

Since 2020, Jackson costars as Max in the Fox comedy series Call Me Kat opposite Mayim Bialik and Kyla Pratt.

In 2022, Jackson competed in season seven of The Masked Singer as "Prince" of Team Good who resembles a frog dressed as a prince. He finished in third place.

=== Musical career ===
Early in his career, Jackson worked as a back-up singer for Vanessa Williams and Heather Headley.

In March 2009, Jackson made his nightclub debut at Feinstein's at Loews Regency with a sold-out one-man show titled Back to the Start. He later teamed up with Michael Feinstein to create a nightclub act titled "The Power of Two". A CD of the show was released on November 3, 2009.

The Power of Two, a concert reuniting Jackson and Feinstein, was presented at Carnegie Hall on October 29, 2010. Jackson was the guest artist performing with the New York Pops in concert, Cheyenne Jackson's Cocktail Hour: Music of the Mad Men Era, at Carnegie Hall on November 18, 2011. Joe Dziemianowicz of The New York Daily News wrote, "There, in Judy (Garland)'s spot singing Joni (Mitchell)'s song, (Cheyenne) Jackson turned the bittersweet ballad into a beautiful highlight in an evening filled with luscious moments with the New York Pops."

On December 31, 2012, Jackson reprised Music of the Mad Men Era at The Kennedy Center Concert Hall with 96 members of the National Symphony Orchestra and Nina Arianda.

In March 2012, Jackson was signed to Sony/ATV publishing as a songwriter and given a developmental artist deal through Sony/ATV's Hickory Records and Red Distribution.

On May 10, 2012, Jackson released his single "Drive", his first non-theatrical single and his first music video release. The video was directed by Austrian music video director Christian Hörlesberger and the track produced by Thomas "Tawgs" Salter. It was the first single released from I'm Blue, Skies, which was eventually released in June 2013. The album was co-written by Jackson with Sia, Stephen "Stevie" Aiello, and Charlotte Sometimes.

On July 10, 2012, Jackson released his second single from I'm Blue, Skies, "Before You", also produced by Salter. In August 2012, "Before You" reached a peak of No. 31 on the Hot 100 AC chart.

In 2013, he released three singles, "She's Pretty, She Lies", "Look at Me", and "I'm Blue, Skies", followed in 2015 with the single "Don't Wanna Know", all accompanied by music videos. On June 3, 2016, Jackson released Renaissance, an album on the PS Classics record label, adapted and expanded from his solo concert Music of the Mad Men Era.

== In the media ==
Jackson appeared on the March 26, 2008, cover of The Advocate. In 2008, he was named "Entertainer of the Year" by Out and appeared alongside Gus Van Sant, Katy Perry, and Sam Sparro on the cover of the magazine's commemorative 100th issue in December. In April 2010, he appeared on the cover of Canadian fab magazine under the title "Cheyenne Jackson: I Love New York" with photographs by Mike Ruiz. He also appeared on the cover of Out's November 2010 issue. In July 2012, he appeared on the cover of attitude.

== Charity work ==
Jackson is an LGBT rights advocate. He is an international ambassador for amfAR (The Foundation for AIDS Research).

Jackson is also a national ambassador and spokesperson for the Hetrick-Martin Institute, a non-profit organization devoted to serving the needs of LGBT youth.

== Personal life ==
Jackson is gay. He began dating Monte Lapka, a physicist, in 2000. The two married on September 3, 2011, in New York City. In July 2013, they announced plans to divorce. They filed for divorce in September 2013.

In October 2013, Jackson announced he was dating actor Jason Landau on his official Instagram account. They announced their engagement in February 2014 and married in Encino, California, in September 2014. Jackson and Landau became the parents of twins, a girl named Willow and a boy named Ethan, in October 2016.

Jackson has discussed his struggles with alcoholism, and in 2023 said that he had relapsed after 10 years of sobriety.

== Discography ==
=== Studio albums ===
Year	Album details	Peak positions		Notes
Year	Album details	US Heat	US Jazz	Notes
2009	The Power of Two (with Michael Feinstein): Released: November 3, 2009; Label: Qualiton Imports, Harbinger Records; Formats: CD, digital download	17	15	
2013	I'm Blue, Skies: Released: June 25, 2013; Label: Shiny Boy Music LLC; Formats: CD, digital download	-	-	No. / Title / Length; 1. / "Before You" / 2:50; 2. / "I'm Blue, Skies" / 3:43; 3. / "Any Day Now" / 3:55; 4. / "She's Pretty, She Lies" / 3:50; 5. / "Drive" / 4:05; 6. / "Mr. Lonely Boy" / 3:45; 7. / "Don't Wanna Know" / 3:50; 8. / "Back Pocket" / 3:36; 9. / "Not Ready to Let You Go" / 2:59; 10. / "Don't Look at Me" / 3:33; 11. / "You Get Me" (feat. Charlotte Sometimes) / 3:25; 12. / "Drive (Conaire Remix)" / 6:47
2016	Renaissance: Released: June 3, 2016; Label: PS Classics; Formats: CD, digital download	-	9	No. / Title / Length; 1. / "Feeling Good"; 2. / "Americano"; 3. / "Angel Eyes"; 4. / "Bésame Mucho"; 5. / "Somethin' Stupid"; 6. / "I (Who Have Nothing)"; 7. / "A Case of You"; 8. / "Walkin' My Baby Back Home"; 9. / "Red Wine Is Good for My Heart"; 10. / "A Song for You"; 11. / "A Change Is Gonna Come"; 12. / "Your Song"

Original Broadway cast albums

- All Shook Up (2005)
- Xanadu (2007)
- Finian's Rainbow (2009)

Soundtrack appearances

- Descendants 3 (2019)
- Julie and the Phantoms: Music from the Netflix Original Series (2020)

=== Singles ===
- 2012: "Drive"
- 2012: "Before You"
- 2013: "Don't Wanna Know"
- 2015: "Find the Best of Me"

=== Music videos ===
- 2012: "Drive"
- 2012: "Before You"
- 2013: "Don't Wanna Know"
- 2013: "Don't Look at Me"
- 2013: "She's Pretty, She Lies"
- 2013: "I'm Blue, Skies"

== Filmography ==
=== Film ===
Year	Title	Role	Notes
2005	Curiosity	Luke	Short film
2006	United 93	Mark Bingham	
2010	Photo Op	Zig	Short film
2010	Hysteria	Scott	
2011	The Green	Daniel	
2011	Smile	Doctor Steve	Short film
2012	Price Check	Ernie	
2012	Lola Versus	Roger	
2013	Mutual Friends	Christoph	
2014	The One I Wrote for You	Ben Cantor	
2014	Six Dance Lessons in Six Weeks	Michael Minetti	
2014	Dragula	Mr. Newton	
2014	Love Is Strange	Ted	
2014	Lucky Stiff	MC	
2015	A Beautiful Now	David	
2015	Day Out of Days	Phil	
2016	Bear with Us	Hudson	
2016	Opening Night	Eli Faisel	
2017	Hello Again	Robert (The Writer)	
2018	Hurricane Bianca 2: From Russia with Hate	Boris	
2021	Werewolves Within	Devon	
2024	Borderlands	Jakobs	Scenes cut
2025	Queens of the Dead	Jimmy	

=== Television ===
Year	Title	Role	Notes
2008	Lipstick Jungle	Bryce	Episode: "Chapter Fifteen: The Sisterhood of the Traveling Prada"
2008	Family Practice	Sebastian Kinglare	Television film
2009	Life on Mars	Sebastian Grace	Episode: "Let All the Children Boogie"
2009	Ugly Betty	Timothy D'Artagnan	Episode: "Sugar Daddy"
2009–2012	30 Rock	Danny Baker	12 episodes
2010	Law & Order	Jon Sorrentino	Episode: "Innocence"
2010	It Takes a Village	Scott	Unsold television pilot
2010–2011	Glee	Dustin Goolsby	3 episodes
2011	Curb Your Enthusiasm	Terry	Episode: "Car Periscope"
2012	Mockingbird Lane	Steve	Unsold television pilot
2013	Onion News Empire	Cameron Grey	Unsold television pilot
2013	Behind the Candelabra	Billy Leatherwood	Television film
2013	Full Circle	Peter Barlow	3 episodes
2014	HR	Tim Harcourt	Unsold television pilot
2014	Royal Pains	Sam	Episode: "Oh, M.G."
2014	CSI: Crime Scene Investigation	Nebula1	Episode: "Kitty"
2015–2016	American Horror Story: Hotel	Will Drake	9 episodes
2016	American Horror Story: Roanoke	Sidney Aaron James	7 episodes
2016	American Housewife	Johnny Diamond	Episode: "Disconnected"
2017–2019	RuPaul's Drag Race	Himself	3 episodes ("Draggily Ever After", "Evil Twins", "L.A.D.P.!")
2017	The Real O'Neals	Mr. Peters	Episode: "The Real Mr. Nice Guy"
2017	Sense8	Blake Huntington	Episode: "If All the World's a Stage, Identity Is Nothing But a Costume"
2017	American Horror Story: Cult	Dr. Rudy Vincent	9 episodes
2017	Modern Family	Max	Episode: "In Your Head"
2018	American Woman	Greg Parker	7 episodes
2018	Will & Grace	Michael	Episode: "The Beefcake & the Cake Beef"
2018	American Horror Story: Apocalypse	John Henry Moore	4 episodes
2019	Descendants 3	Hades	Television film
2019	The Morning Show	Himself	Episode: "No One's Gonna Harm You, Not While I'm Around"
2019	Watchmen	Hooded Justice	3 episodes
2020	Descendants Remix Dance Party	Hades	Television special
2020	Equal	Dale Jennings	Docuseries
2020	Julie and the Phantoms	Caleb Covington	5 episodes
2020	Saved by the Bell	René	3 episodes
2021–2023	Call Me Kat	Max	Main role
2021	RuPaul's Drag Race: All Stars	Himself	Special guest, Episode: "Snatch Game of Love"
2021	A Clüsterfünke Christmas	Frank	Television film
2021	Descendants: The Royal Wedding	Hades (voice)	Animated television film
2022	The Masked Singer	Prince	Season 7 contestant; Third place
2024	Doctor Odyssey	Bryan	Episode: "Oh, Daddy!"

== Stage credits ==
Year	Title	Role	Venue	Notes
1995	Kiss Me, Kate	Bill Calhoun / Lucentio	Spokane Civic Theatre	Regional
1996	Kismet	Hajj	Spokane Civic Theatre	Regional
1997	Carousel	Billy Bigelow	Spokane Civic Theatre	Regional
1998	Children of Eden	Cain / Japheth	Jane Addams Theatre	Regional
2002-2003	Thoroughly Modern Millie	Dishwasher / Ensemble u/s Jimmy Smith u/s Trevor Graydon III	Marquis Theatre	Broadway
2003	The Rocky Horror Show	Rocky	5th Avenue Theatre	Regional
2003	Aida	s/b Radames	Palace Theatre	Broadway
2004	Altar Boyz	Matthew	Puerto Rican Traveling Theater	New York Musical Theatre Festival
2005	All Shook Up	Chad	Palace Theatre	Broadway
2005	On the Twentieth Century	"Life is Like a Train" Porter	New Amsterdam Theatre	Broadway
2005	The 24 Hour Plays	Kevin	American Airlines Theatre	Broadway
2006	The Agony and The Agony	Chet	Vineyard Theatre	Off-Broadway
2007-2008	Xanadu	Sonny Malone	Helen Hayes Theatre	Broadway
2008	Damn Yankees	Joe Hardy	New York City Center	Off-Broadway; Encores!
2009	Finian's Rainbow	Woody	New York City Center	Off-Broadway; Encores!
2009-2010	Finian's Rainbow	Woody	St. James Theatre	Broadway
2011	8	Paul Katami	Eugene O'Neill Theatre	Broadway
2012	The Heart of the Matter	Him	Lucille Lortel Theatre	Off-Broadway
2012	The Performers	Mandrew	Longacre Theatre	Broadway
2013	West Side Story	Tony	Davies Hall	Concert
2014	The Most Happy Fella	Joe	New York City Center	Off-Broadway; Encores!
2016	The Secret Garden	Dr. Neville Craven	Lincoln Center	25th Anniversary Concert
2019	Into the Woods	The Wolf / Cinderella's Prince	Hollywood Bowl	July 26–28
2022	Into the Woods	The Wolf / Cinderella's Prince	St. James Theatre	Broadway
2024	Once Upon a Mattress	Sir Harry	New York City Center	Off-Broadway; Encores!
2024	La Cage aux Folles	Georges	Pasadena Playhouse	Los Angeles
2025–2026	Oh, Mary!	Mary’s Teacher	Lyceum Theatre	Broadway

== Awards and honors ==
Year	Award	Category	Work	Result	Ref.
2005	Drama League Award	Distinguished Performance Award	All Shook Up	Nominated	
2005	Outer Critics Circle Award	Outstanding Performance by a Lead Actor	All Shook Up	Nominated	
2005	Theatre World Award	Outstanding Broadway Debut	All Shook Up	Nominated	
2006	Boston Society of Film Critics	Best Ensemble Cast	United 93	Won	
2008	Drama League Award	Distinguished Performance Award	Xanadu	Nominated	
2008	Drama Desk Award	Outstanding Actor in a Musical	Xanadu	Nominated	
2010	Drama Desk Award	Outstanding Actor in a Musical	Finian's Rainbow	Nominated	
2015	Grammy Award	Best Musical Theater Album	West Side Story	Nominated	
2021	Daytime Emmy Awards	Outstanding Performance by a Supporting Actor in a Daytime Fiction Program	Julie and the Phantoms	Nominated	
2023	Broadway.com Audience Choice Awards	Favorite Replacement (Male)	Into the Woods	Nominated	

== See also ==
- LGBT culture in New York City
- List of LGBT people from New York City
- NYC Pride March
