= Ernest Graves (actor) =

American actor (1919-1983)

- Graves in the 1950s
- Born: May 5, 1919; Chicago, Illinois
- Died: June 1, 1983 (aged 64); New York City, New York
- Occupation: Actor
- Years active: 1941–1983
- Known for: Victor Lord (One Life to Live)
- Spouse: Helen Grant
- Children: 1

Ernest Graves (May 5, 1919 – June 1, 1983) was an American film, theatre, and television actor. He is best remembered for his portrayal of the original Victor Lord on the ABC daytime soap opera One Life to Live from 1968 to 1974.

== Early life ==
Born in Chicago, Graves graduated from the Goodman Theatre of the Chicago Art Institute in 1940.

== Career ==
=== Theatre ===
Graves starred in eleven broadway productions in his career. In the 1940s, he starred in Macbeth, The Russian People, Men in Shadow, Cyrano de Bergerac with José Ferrer, and Eastward in Eden. In the 1950s, Graves starred in As You Like It, Much Ado About Nothing, and Tiger at the Gates. In the 1960s, he starred in Dylan, Venus Is which never opened. In the 1970s, he starred in Poor Murderer. and Golda with Anne Bancroft. Before his death in the 1980s, Graves was on a national tour with Yul Brynner in The King and I.

=== Film ===
Graves starred in Walk East on Beacon (1952), the cult film Hercules in New York (1970), and The Dogs of War (1980).

=== Television ===
Graves was a regular on the NBC drama Today Is Ours (1958). He also was featured on several daytime soap operas, including The Brighter Day, Guiding Light, The Edge of Night, As the World Turns, and Another World. He was on three episodes of Search for Tomorrow. Graves starred the made-for-TV movie adaptation of the play The Ceremony of Innocence for NET Playhouse. He is best remembered for his portrayal of the original Victor Lord on the ABC daytime drama One Life to Live from 1968 to 1974.

== Personal life and death ==
Graves was married Helen Grant on December 12, 1963. Together, they had one daughter, Leslie. On June 1, 1983, he died of cancer at age 64 at Memorial Sloan-Kettering Cancer Center in New York City.

== Theatre ==
Start date	End date	Title	Role	Venue	Notes
November 11, 1941	February 8, 1942	Macbeth	Menteith	National Theatre	131 performances
December 29, 1942	January 31, 1943	The Russian People	Wounded Man	Guild Theatre	39 performances
March 12, 1943	March 27, 1943	Men in Shadow	Enshaw	Morosco Theatre	21 performances
October 8, 1946	March 22, 1947	Cyrano de Bergerac	Christian De Neuvillette	Alvin Theatre / Ethel Barrymore Theatre	193 performances
November 18, 1947	November 29, 1947	Eastward in Eden	Ben Newton	Royale Theatre	15 performances
January 26, 1950	April 3, 1950	As You Like It	Oliver de Boys	Cort Theatre	145 performances
May 1, 1952	May 3, 1952	Much Ado About Nothing	Don Pedro	Music Box Theatre	4 performances
October 3, 1955	April 7, 1956	Tiger at the Gates	Messenger; Ajax (Note: Replacement for Felix Munso)	Plymouth Theatre / Helen Hayes Theatre	217 performances
January 18, 1964	September 12, 1964	Dylan	Jay Henry Antone	Plymouth Theatre	273 performances
April 5, 1966	April 5, 1966	Venus Is	Vincent Martin	Billy Rose Theatre	Never opened
October 20, 1976	January 2, 1977	Poor Murderer	Various (Note: Third actor, Dean, Lawyer, Maj. Count Byelitsky, Kurganov, King, Others)	Ethel Barrymore Theatre	87 performances
November 14, 1977	February 16, 1978	Golda	Various (Note: D. P., "Arab" Escort, Bar-Lev)	Morosco Theatre	93 performances
February 18, 1981	June 3, 1983	The King and I	Sir Edward Ramsay	National tour	18 performances

== Filmography ==
=== Film ===
Year	Title	Role	Director(s)	Notes
1952	Walk East on Beacon	Robert Martin	Alfred L. Werker	Noir Drama film
1961	One Plus One	John Bradley - 'Homecoming' segment	Arch Oboler	Drama film
1970	Hercules in New York	Zeus	Arthur Allan Seidelman	Fantasy action comedy film
1980	The Dogs of War	Warner	John Irvin	Action-thriller war film Based on the 1974 novel of the same name by Frederick Forsyth
1981	The Frog King	Father	Tom Davenport	Short film

=== Television ===
Year	Title	Role	Notes
1949–50	The Philco Television Playhouse	Christian de Neuvillette; N/a	Episodes: "Cyrano de Bergerac"; "The Feast"
1950–57	Studio One	Various	4 episodes
1951	Armstrong Circle Theatre	Guest	Episode: "By the Book"
1950–52	Lux Video Theatre	Various	4 episodes
1952	Out There	Guest	Episode: "The Castaway"
1952	Suspense	Aide	Episode: "Betrayal in Vienna"
1952	The Hunter	Guest	Episode: "Bucharest Express"
1952–53	Broadway Television Theatre	Various	3 episodes
1953	Robert Montgomery Presents	Guest	Episode: "Ricochet"
1953	Tales of Tomorrow	The Voice	Episode: "Read to Me, Herr Doktor"
1954	Martin Kane, Private Eye	Doctor Esker	Episode: "The Shoeshine Murder"
1954	Ponds Theater	Guest	Episode: "A Connecticut Yankee in King Arthur's Court"
1957	The Edge of Night	Ed Parmalee	2 episodes Credit only
1957–58	Men of Annapolis	Morgan; Adams	Episodes: "Blue & Gray"; "The Genius"
1958	Today Is Ours	Glenn Turner	Main role
1960	The Brighter Day	Eliot Clark #2	
1960	As the World Turns	Dr. David Stewart	2 episodes
1961	Naked City	Lawyer	Episode: "A Wednesday Night Story"
1962–66	Guiding Light	Alex Bowden	5 episodes
1967	Another World	Dr. Francis X. McCurdy	Episode: "#1.759"
1967	Search for Tomorrow	Walter Haskins	3 episodes
1968–74	One Life to Live	Victor Lord #1	138 episodes
1970	NET Playhouse	King Sweyn	Episode: "The Ceremony of Innocence"

== Sources ==
- Schemering, Christopher (1985). The Soap Opera Encyclopedia (Paperback). New York City: Ballantine Books. pp. 126, 158–166, 200–2012, 220. ISBN 978-0345324597.
- Waggett, Gerard J. (1997). "One Life to Live". The Soap Opera Encyclopedia. New York City: Harper. pp. 150, 163–188, 220, 254–266, 382, 408–409. ISBN 978-0061011573.
- Terrace, Vincent (2011). Encyclopedia of Television Shows, 1925 through 2010 (2nd ed.). Jefferson, North Carolina: McFarland & Company. p. 1090. ISBN 978-0-7864-6477-7.
- Guernsey, Otis L. (1977). The Best Plays of 1976–1977. New York City: Dodd, Mead and Company. pp. 294–295. ISBN 978-0396075011. Archived from the original on February 26, 2020.
- Maltin, Leonard (2003). Leonard Maltin's Movie and Video Guide 2004 (Paperback). London: Penguin Group. p. 610. ISBN 978-0452284784.
