= Harvest of Fire =

1996 television film by Arthur Allan Seidelman

- Screenplay by: Richard Alfieri; Susan Nanus
- Story by: Susan Nanus
- Directed by: Arthur Allan Seidelman
- Starring: Lolita Davidovich; J. A. Preston; Jean Louisa Kelly; Tom Aldredge; James Read; Craig Wasson; Patty Duke
- Composer: Lee Holdridge
- Country of origin: United States
- Original language: English

Production
- Executive producers: Bernard Sofronski; Richard Welsh
- Cinematography: Neil Roach
- Editor: Bert Glatstein
- Running time: 99 minutes
- Production companies: Bernard Sofronski Productions; Hallmark Hall of Fame Productions

Original release
- Network: CBS
- Release: April 21, 1996

Harvest of Fire is an American mystery drama television film that premiered on CBS on April 21, 1996, as part of the Hallmark Hall of Fame anthology series. The film is directed by Arthur Allan Seidelman, from a teleplay by Richard Alfieri and Susan Nanus, and story by Nanus. It stars Lolita Davidovich as an FBI agent sent to investigate an arson in a peaceful Amish township, alongside J. A. Preston, Jean Louisa Kelly, Tom Aldredge, James Read, Craig Wasson, and Patty Duke. The film won a Primetime Emmy Award for its sound mixing.

== Overview ==
The film was to some extent inspired by the arson of eight Amish barns that occurred in summer 1992 in Pennsylvania and that was investigated by the FBI as a hate crime. There are also similarities between Harvest of Fire and the 1985 film Witness.

== Plot ==
FBI agent Sally Russwell (Lolita Davidovich) is sent to investigate a presumed hate crime in a small Amish community in Iowa after three barns are burnt down. Given a rather cool welcome by the locals when she arrives at the crime scene Sally is able to gain the confidence of Amish widow Annie Beiler (Patty Duke). A shaky but solid bond is formed between the two women which enables Sally to go on with her investigation. Slowly, Sally starts to learn more about Amish customs. She suspects an Amishman is behind the arson and asks to stay with Annie's family to get a deeper insight into the community. This results in Sally's discovering that Annie's daughter is seeing a young man whose father is being shunned for having built a barn not according to Amish rules.

== Cast ==
- Lolita Davidovich as Sally Russell
- J. A. Preston as Sheriff Garrison
- Jean Louisa Kelly as Rachel
- Tom Aldredge as Jacob Hostetler
- James Read as Scott
- Craig Wasson as Philip Dixon
- Patty Duke as Annie Beiler
- Jeff Kizer as Lester
- Wesley Addy as Bishop Levi Lapp
- Gary Bisig as Amos Zook
- Justin Chambers as George
- Jennifer Garner as Sarah Troyer
- Bette Henritze as Mary Lapp
- Catherine Kellner as Nancy
- Marta Kristen as Martha Troyer
- Gabriel Mann as John Beiler
- Eric Mabius as Sam Hostetler
- Sam Huntington as Nathan Hostetler
- Peter McRobbie as Reuben Troyer

== Reception ==
=== Critical response ===
Todd Everett of Variety concluded his review by writing: "Scenery, filmed around Iowa City, is lovely and well-used, and performances are solid, if not spectacular. Amish, of course, are supposed to be restrained." Lynne Heffley of the Los Angeles Times called the film "uninspired" and stated: "The tale, directed by Arthur Allan Seidelman, unfolds without much suspense, but writers Richard Alfieri and Susan Nanus' respectful glimpse into Amish life is fascinating, and Duke does an admirable job as a quiet, dignified voice for Amish faith and community life. Davidovich fares less well, finding little to do with her cliched, sophisticated career-woman role except strike poses." Tom Jicha of the Sun-Sentinel described it as "a solid character-driven drama suitable for the entire family without being smarmy" and praised the performances of Duke and Davidovich, saying that they "bring out top performances."

=== Awards and nominations ===
Year	Award	Category	Recipient(s)	Result
1996	48th Primetime Creative Arts Emmy Awards	Outstanding Art Direction for a Miniseries or a Special	Jan Scott; Paul Steffensen; Erica Rogalla	Nominated
1996	48th Primetime Creative Arts Emmy Awards	Outstanding Sound Mixing for a Drama Miniseries or a Special	Richard I. Birnbaum; David E. Fluhr; Sam Black; John Asman	Won
1997	4th Cinema Audio Society Awards	Outstanding Achievement in Sound Mixing for Television – Movie of the Week, Mini-Series or Specials	Richard I. Birnbaum; David E. Fluhr; Sam Black; John Asman	Nominated
1997	1st Golden Satellite Awards	Best Actress – Miniseries or TV Film	Lolita Davidovich	Nominated
1997	49th Writers Guild of America Awards	Best Long Form – Original	Richard Alfieri; Susan Nanus	Won
