= Six Dance Lessons in Six Weeks (film) =

2014 film directed by Arthur Allen Seidelman

- Directed by: Arthur Allan Seidelman
- Written by: Richard Alfieri
- Based on: Six Dance Lessons in Six Weeks (2001 play) by Richard Alfieri
- Produced by: Thomas H. Brodek; György Gattyán; András Somkuti
- Starring: Gena Rowlands; Cheyenne Jackson; Rita Moreno; Julian Sands; Kathleen Rose Perkins; Anthony Zerbe; Simon Miller; Jacki Weaver
- Cinematography: Vilmos Zsigmond
- Edited by: Bert Glatstein
- Music by: Attila Pacsay
- Production companies: Docler Entertainment; Entpro
- Distributed by: Brainstorm Media (U.S.)
- Release date: December 12, 2014
- Running time: 107 minutes
- Country: United States; Hungary
- Language: English
- Box office: $106,323

Six Dance Lessons in Six Weeks is a 2014 comedy drama film directed by Arthur Allan Seidelman, and adapted by Richard Alfieri from his 2001 stage play. It stars Gena Rowlands and Cheyenne Jackson, alongside a supporting cast including Jacki Weaver, Rita Moreno, Julian Sands and Anthony Zerbe.

The film was released on December 12, 2014, to mixed reviews. This was the final film of Rowlands before she retired in 2015, followed by her death in 2024. It was also the final film of cinematographer Vilmos Zsigmond.

== Plot ==
A retired woman hires a dance instructor to give her private dance lessons at her home—one per week for six weeks. What begins as an antagonistic relationship turns into a close friendship as they dance together.

== Cast ==
- Gena Rowlands as Lily Harrison
- Cheyenne Jackson as Michael Minetti
- Julian Sands as Winslow Cunard
- Jacki Weaver as Irene Mossbecker
- Rita Moreno as Ida Barksdale
- Kathleen Rose Perkins as Susie
- Anthony Zerbe as Mr. Crumwald
- Simon Miller as Robert
- Nóra Hörich as Nan

== Production ==
The film was directed by Arthur Allan Seidelman, who previously directed the stage version. Ann-Margret was originally cast as Irene, but dropped out after her husband Roger Smith fell ill.

Most of the film was shot at Fót Studios in Budapest, Hungary, with exterior location shooting in St. Pete Beach and Clearwater, Florida.

== Reception ==
Six Dance Lessons in Six Weeks received mixed reviews from critics. It has a 60% approval rating on Rotten Tomatoes based on 10 reviews, with an average score of 5.29/10.

Justin Chang of Variety wrote "A flat-footed stage piece gets a better screen interpreter than it deserves in Gena Rowlands, a delight to watch even in the creaky, listless affair that is Six Dance Lessons in Six Weeks." Nicolas Rapold of The New York Times wrote "The soppy, instructive story of acceptance feels handed down from another era, though Ms. Rowlands can fire off a one-liner at 20 paces, and she effortlessly conveys oh-my-oh-me adorable." Stephen Whitty of The Star-Ledger referred to the film as "a very poor movie." Nicholas Bell of Ion Cinema called it "A product that ends up being incredibly sweet and surprisingly charming, even though it never transcends its choppy staginess, which is glaringly evident whenever it turns away from the unique energy of its two leads."
