= The Ceremony of Innocence =

1970 film by Arthur Allan Seidelman

- Directed by: Ken Rockefeller; Arthur Allan Seidelman
- Written by: Ronald Ribman
- Produced by: Bob Markell
- Starring: Richard Kiley; James Broderick; Larry Gates; Gilmer McCormick; Ernest Graves
- Edited by: Murray Solomon
- Music by: Charles Gross
- Release date: 1970
- Language: English

The Ceremony of Innocence is a 1970 television movie adaptation of the play by the same name which depicts a highly fictionalized account of the events leading up to Sweyn Forkbeard's invasion of England in AD 1013. Richard Kiley stars as King Ethelred with James Broderick, Larry Gates, and Gilmer McCormick. The script was written by Ronald Ribman and the film was directed by Ken Rockefeller and Arthur Allan Seidelman. Bob Markell produced The Ceremony of Innocence.

== Cast ==
(as listed in the program)

- James Broderick as Sussex
- Larry Gates as Kent
- Robert Gerringer as Bishop Aelfhun
- Ernest Graves as King Sweyn
- Howard Green as Thorkill
- John Horn as Prince Edmund
- Elizabeth Hubbard as Queen Emma
- Richard Kiley as King Ethelred
- Jessie Royce Landis as Queen Alfreda
- Michael Lombard as Abbot
- Gilmer McCormick as Thulja

== See also ==
- List of historical drama films
