= Gil Gutierrez =

Mexican guitarist and composer

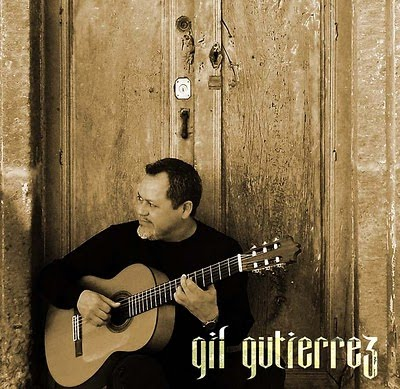
Gil Gutiérrez Guitarist

Gil Gutiérrez (born May 1, 1962 in Oaxaca, Mexico) is a virtuoso Mexican guitarist and composer. He has played Carnegie Hall in New York and with symphony orchestras in the United States.

== Education ==
Gil went to study sculpture, painting and ceramics at the art academy in Oaxaca. It was there that he first heard the sounds of classical music and learned to play cello on a borrowed instrument. He then switched to a guitar which was a gift from his brother, because his family could not afford a cello. At the Benito Juarez Autonomous University in Oaxaca, Gutiérrez studied classical guitar and his musical interests spread to diverse genres including classical, flamenco, son cubano and jazz.

== Career ==
At age fourteen he began playing classical guitar in restaurants in Oaxaca and caught the attention of German born guitarist Wolfgang “Lobo” Fink of Willie & Lobo. At 17, he teamed up with Fink to play venues in San Miguel de Allende, Mexico. When Fink returned to Germany, Gutiérrez went to Mexico City to study jazz earning money by playing his guitar on city buses. The guitarist has played in South America and Spain with Ana Gabriel, Ricardo Arjona, Francisco Cespedes, and Pedro Guerra. A virtuoso with the nylon string guitar and tres, Gutiérrez has performed at the Kennedy Center, the Mexican Cultural Institute of the Mexican Embassy in Washington D.C. and to a crowd of 10,000 people at Millennium Park, Chicago. Gutierrez is recognized for his unique ability to connect with the audience and channeling a bit of the local energy into each performance.

Renowned across the music industry, Gil Gutiérrez is hailed as one of Mexico’s finest musicians, recognized for his exceptional skill and celebrated for his extraordinary ability to blend classical, jazz, and flamenco styles. He gave several performances at New York City's renowned Jazz Standard alongside bassist David Rodríguez and violinist Robert Stern before the venue closed permanently during the pandemic. His concerts at legendary venues like New York City's Birdland are a magnet for music lovers and celebrities alike. His performances are known for their spontaneous energy, with notable guests like Bonnie Raitt, Meryl Streep, and Doc Severinsen sometimes joining him on stage during jam sessions.

Gutiérrez talent was discovered by Doc Severinsen who heard him play in a restaurant in San Miguel de Allende. Severinsen led the NBC Orchestra for twenty years on Johnny Carson's Tonight Show. They recorded their first album together in 2007 called En Mi Corazon. Gutierrez is the band leader, founder and musical director of the group the San Miguel 5 and they have performed with symphony orchestras across the United States. Other musicians of the San Miguel 5 include Grammy Award winning violinist Charlie Bisharat, Cuban percussionist Jimmy Branly and bass player Kevin Thomas. In 2011 Gil Gutiérrez and Doc Severinsen played at New York City's Carnegie Hall accompanied by the New York Pops under the direction of conductor Steven Reineke.

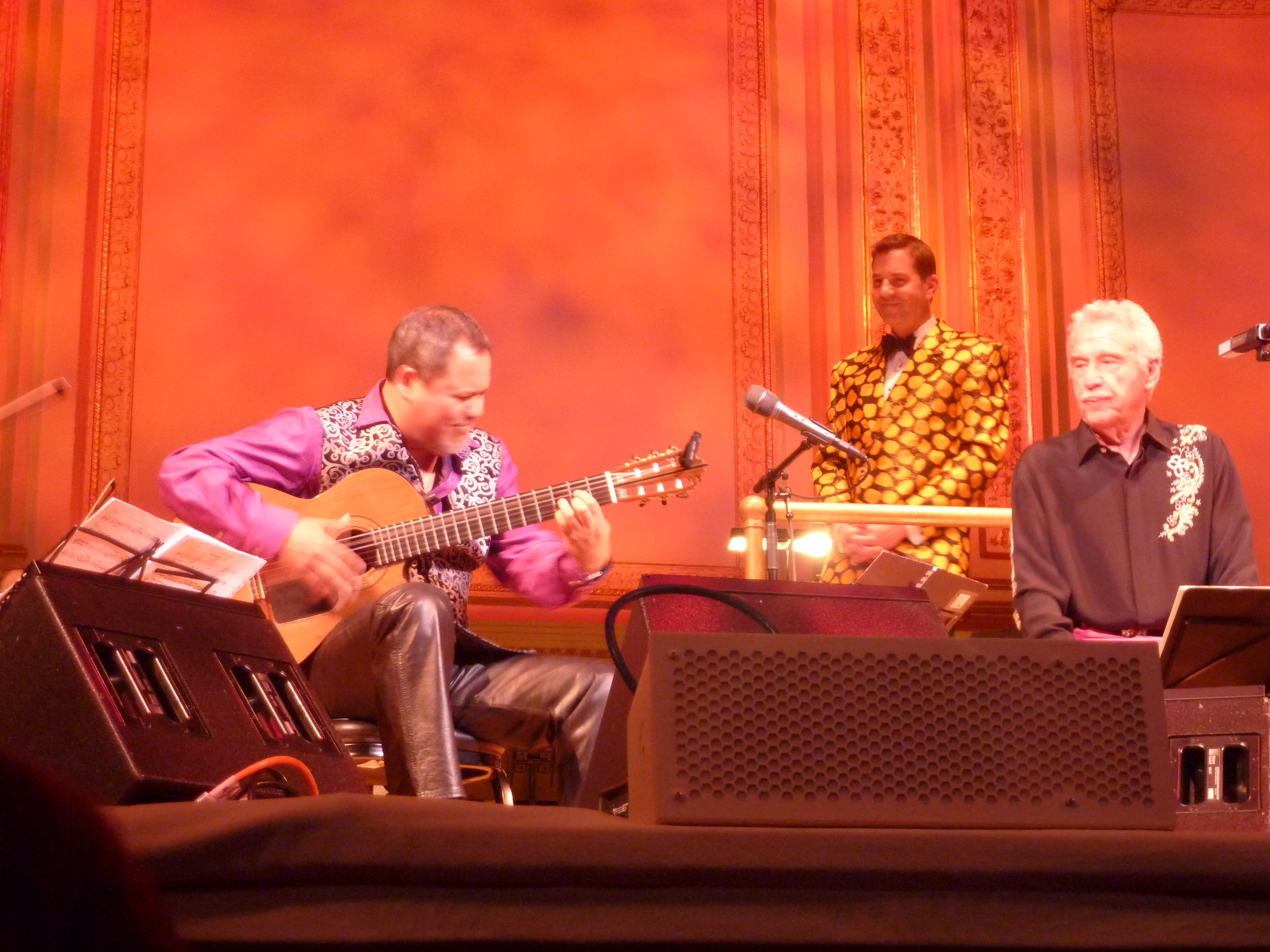
Gil Gutiérrez performs live at Carnegie Hall with Doc Severinsen and Steven Reineke

Gutiérrez has performed as a soloist with the Minnesota Symphony, Florida Symphony and with the Doc Severinsen Big Band Tour in Dallas, Texas. In 2013 he was the featured artist and directed the ensemble at the Calaca Festival honoring Chavela Vargas in San Miguel de Allende. For three consecutive years, the Gil Gutiérrez Trio has performed at Caffe Lena in Saratoga Springs. Likewise, he has delivered energetic repeat performances at the Shalin Liu Performance Center Rockport, Massachusetts where his music was framed by sweeping views of the Atlantic Ocean. In 2023 Gil was featured on the PBS documentary American Masters in an episode called "Never Too Late" focusing on the career of Doc Severinsen. Constantly pushing boundaries as a musical director he brings together new combinations of musicians and musical styles. These include opera, jazz, cantaor flamenco, Cuban and Mexican styles to create performances considered the cultural vanguard. Among his works are performances of his original compositions with the New York Choral Society and scoring of several films including El Cochero, El Alcazar de Chapultepec and Una Causa Noble. Gutiérrez composed and performed the soundtrack for the documentary film Lost and Found in Mexico. In 2013 Gutierrez was featured in the National Geographic Traveler documentary The Granny Diaries. He was a special guest soloist with Arturo Sandoval in the Mexico City Palace of Fine Arts.

He continues to tour and perform in Canada, Latin America and the United States.

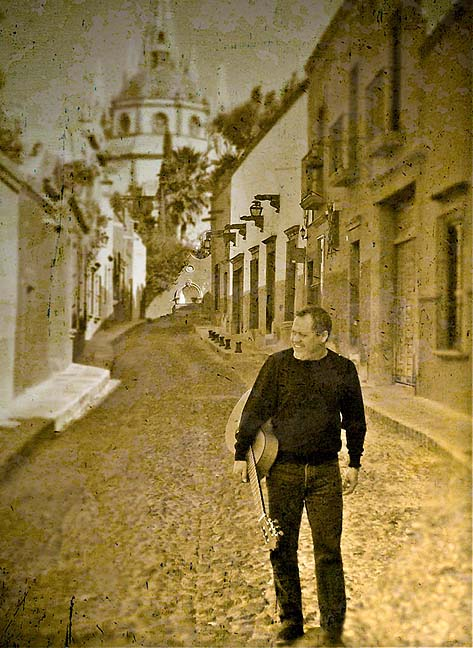
Guitarist Gil Gutiérrez on Aldama in San Miguel de Allende, Mexico

Gil Gutiérrez lives in the UNESCO World Heritage city of San Miguel de Allende, Mexico.

== Discography ==
- July 2002: Huapangos Toreros
- January 2004: Adios Nonino
- January 2004: Danza Característica
- January 2005: Huapangos Toreros/ Celoso
- May 2005: Lagrima Del Toro
- May 2006: The Lonely Hippo
- October 2006: Bad Hair Day
- January 2007: En Mi Corazón with Doc Severinsen
- January 2008: Delfis
- January 2009: El Ritmo de la Vida with Doc Severinsen
- January 2012: Tejate
- January 2013: Gil Gutiérrez Live in Concert
- July 2013: The Sound of Latin Jazz
- January 2014: Oblivion with Doc Severinsen
