= Arthur Allan Seidelman =

American television, film, and theatre director

Arthur Allan Seidelman (born 1937 in New York City) is an American television, film, and theatre director and an occasional writer, producer, and actor. His works are distinguished by a humane, probing, and sympathetic depiction of characters facing ethical challenges. His approach to directing is guided by his belief that character and relationships, along with an emphasis on genuine emotion over intellectualization, are the keys to unlocking the dramatic potential of a performance, a play, or a screenplay.

== Early life and career ==
Born in the Bronx, the son of Jeanne and Theodore Seidelman and nephew of Yiddish Theatre star Isidore Casher, Seidelman received his B.A. from Whittier College and an M.A. in Theatre from UCLA. He subsequently studied with Group Theatre (New York City) co-founder Sanford Meisner, who became a lifelong friend and mentor. Seidelman credits Meisner with teaching him how to approach actors and to find the cord of inner realism that ignites a scene. Seidelman also studied with Group Theatre co-founder Harold Clurman.

Walter Kerr praised Seidelman's 1970 revival of Clifford Odets' Awake and Sing as an "astonishingly fresh and deeply moving evening" and wrote also that it was "directed and played as nakedly as though no one were watching."

== Film ==
Seidelman made his screen directorial debut with Hercules in New York, a 1969 comedy-action film starring Arnold Schwarzenegger in his first feature, which has become a cult classic. He then co-wrote and directed Children of Rage starring Helmut Griem as an Israeli doctor caught up in the Arab-Israeli conflict, and also starring Simon Ward and Cyril Cusack. The film was the first Hollywood feature to address issues on both sides of the conflict, and it was screened for major international bodies including the United Nations General Assembly and the United States Senate Committee on Foreign Relations. Seidelman also directed The Caller, a science fiction thriller shot at Rome’s Cinecittà Studios, starring Malcolm McDowell and Madolyn Smith and the 2007 film Black Friday (also known as The Kidnapping).

Seidelman's film The Sisters (2005 film), a modern adaptation of Anton Chekhov’s Three Sisters (play), stars Maria Bello, Mary Stuart Masterson, and Tony Goldwyn, and premiered at the Tribeca Film Festival (now known as the Tribeca Festival). The film won numerous awards including the Santa Fe Film Festival Milagro Award for Best American Independent Film.

He also directed Walking Across Egypt with Ellen Burstyn, Echoes, a reincarnation thriller, and Puerto Vallarta Squeeze, starring Scott Glenn and Harvey Keitel in a film adaptation by Richard Alfieri of the novel by Robert James Waller. Seidelman's most recent feature film Six Dance Lessons in Six Weeks stars Gena Rowlands as the widow of a Southern Baptist minister and Cheyenne Jackson as her gay dance instructor, and also stars Jacki Weaver and Rita Moreno.

== Television ==
Seidelman has directed many award-winning television productions, including Alan Menken and Lynn Ahrens’ film musical A Christmas Carol-The Musical for NBC starring Kelsey Grammer, Jesse L. Martin, Jane Krakowski, Jennifer Love Hewitt, Geraldine Chaplin, and Jason Alexander. The film, shot entirely in Budapest with Dickens-era sets erected on the back lot of Mafilm Studios, has become a holiday classic.

He directed four highly acclaimed Hallmark Hall of Fame productions: Grace and Glorie starring Gena Rowlands, Diane Lane, and Viola Davis, The Summer of Ben Tyler starring James Woods and Elizabeth McGovern, Harvest of Fire starring Patty Duke, and The Runaway starring Maya Angelou. He also directed Like Mother Like Son: The Strange Story of Sante and Kenny Kimes starring Mary Tyler Moore for CBS, Strange Voices and The People Across the Lake both for NBC and both starring Valerie Harper, By Dawn's Early Light with Richard Crenna and David Carradine for HBO, The Kid Who Loved Christmas starring Cicely Tyson, Michael Warren, and Sammy Davis Jr. for Eddie Murphy Productions and Paramount Television, and Miracle in the Woods starring Della Reese and Meredith Baxter for CBS. Strange Voices was one of 1987's highest rated made-for-TV movies with a 33 share in the Nielsen TV Ratings. Seidelman also directed Black Friday (also known as The Kidnapping) with Judd Nelson, and Sin of Innocence starring Dee Wallace and, in his film debut, Dermot Mulroney. His CBS film Poker Alice, shot on location in Old Tucson, starred Elizabeth Taylor in her first romantic comedy/western. He directed the first film made by the Disney Channel, A Friendship in Vienna, from a screenplay by Richard Alfieri, and starring Jane Alexander and Ed Asner. The film is screened in schools as a teaching tool about The Holocaust. Seidelman's NBC movie Kate's Secret, starring Meredith Baxter Birney as a woman fighting bulimia, remains one of the most watched made-for-television films in TV history.

Seidelman cut his teeth in television by directing episodes of many renowned series including Fame, The Paper Chase, Knots Landing, Hill Street Blues, Magnum, P.I., Murder, She Wrote, Trapper John, M.D., L.A. Law, and A Year in the Life, for which he received numerous Emmy Awards and Emmy nominations. He hosted the PBS series Actors on Acting and staged Norman Lear’s 1982 all-star American Broadcasting Company variety show special I Love Liberty featuring Barbra Streisand, Jane Fonda, Burt Lancaster, Walter Matthau, Mary Tyler Moore, and Martin Sheen. He also won a Writers Guild of America Award for his contribution to I Love Liberty.

Seidelman also guest starred in the final episode of ER.

== Theatre ==
Seidelman directed Broadway productions of Billy (1969), a musical adaptation of Billy Budd; Vieux Carré (1977) by Tennessee Williams; and Six Dance Lessons in Six Weeks (2003) by Richard Alfieri. He directed a revival of The Most Happy Fella for the New York City Opera in 1991. He has had considerable success off-Broadway with acclaimed productions of The Ceremony of Innocence, by Ronald Ribman, Awake and Sing by Clifford Odets and Hamp by John Wilson, among others. He also directed Madama Butterfly for Opera Santa Barbara and The Gypsy Princess for Opera Pacific. In Los Angeles, he has directed major revivals of Hair, Of Thee I Sing, Mack and Mabel, The Boys from Syracuse, Follies, and others. Also in Los Angeles, he directed the first productions of Six Dance Lessons in Six Weeks and The Sisters. For regional theatres, he has directed Cat on a Hot Tin Roof, The Little Foxes, A Man for All Seasons, The Roar of the Greasepaint – The Smell of the Crowd, Romeo and Juliet, Stop the World – I Want to Get Off, and The Tempest, among others. In addition, he served as the Administrator of the Forum Theatre (now the Mitzi E. Newhouse Theater) for the Repertory Theater of Lincoln Center for the Performing Arts and as Artistic Director of Theatre Vanguard in Los Angeles.

He has directed Richard Alfieri's Six Dance Lessons in Six Weeks in its Los Angeles premiere (with Uta Hagen and David Hyde Pierce) at the Geffen Playhouse and on Broadway (with Polly Bergen and Mark Hamill), in the West End (with Claire Bloom and Billy Zane), at the Coconut Grove Playhouse (with Rue McClanahan and Mark Hamill), and a Los Angeles revival (with Constance Towers and Jason Graae). The play has gone on to become one of the most-produced plays in the world with productions in 27 countries. Seidelman recently directed Alfieri's latest play, Revolutions, at the Barter Theatre.

== Awards ==
Seidelman's honors include two Emmy Awards, five Emmy nominations, a Peabody Awards, an Obie Award, and the Festival Award (Grand Prize) from the New York Film and Television Festival, as well as prizes from the Chicago International Film Festival , San Francisco International Film Festival, Palm Springs International Film Festival, and Heartland International Film Festival, the Humanitas Prize, the National Cowboy & Western Heritage Museum, three Christopher Awards, and the 2023 Sharm El-Sheikh Samiha Ayoub Award for Contribution to Understanding between Nations and Peoples.

== Personal life ==
Seidelman was stricken with polio at age 9, and, as he was being rushed to the hospital, he overheard a paramedic tell his parents that he would never walk again. Undaunted and determined, after spending months in an iron lung and undergoing years of physical therapy, he did regain his mobility. He later stated that battling polio prepared him for the challenges of a career in show business.

Burt Reynolds, after working with Seidelman on the NBC TV series Amazing Grace, said of him, "He's the only director I've worked with in years who knows what to say to an actor other than, 'Turn right at the couch.'"

While researching the film Children of Rage, he lived extensively in the Middle East, including in refugee camps in Lebanon, where at one point, he was taken hostage by members of the Popular Front for the Liberation of Palestine. After days in captivity, during which he convinced them that the project would present a balanced view of the Arab/Israeli conflict, Seidelman was released.
