= Strange Voices =

1987 American made-for-television film

- Promotional advertisement
- Genre: Drama
- Written by: Donna Powers; Wayne Powers
- Directed by: Arthur Allan Seidelman
- Starring: Nancy McKeon; Valerie Harper
- Theme music composer: John Addison
- Country of origin: United States
- Original language: English

Production
- Executive producers: Joan Barnett; Alan Landsburg; Howard Lipstone
- Producers: Nancy Geller; Linda Otto
- Cinematography: Hanania Baer
- Editor: Robin Wilson
- Running time: 100 minutes
- Production companies: Forest Hills Productions; Landsburg Company

Original release
- Network: NBC
- Release: October 19, 1987

Strange Voices is a 1987 American made-for-television drama film about schizophrenia directed by Arthur Allan Seidelman and written by Wayne and Donna Powers. It was one of the ten highest rated made-for-television movies that year with a 33 share in the Nielsen ratings. The reviews were mixed as the film was criticized as inferior to other made-for-television movies about the disorder, including Promise (1986). The New York Times, for instance, called it "too much, too late".

== Plot ==
Nicole is a bright, gifted and attractive college student, with a normal home life and a boyfriend. Trouble starts when she is troubled by her father's computer print-outs; subsequently, she becomes paranoid that her boyfriend (Jeff) is cheating on her and comments that "they" told her everything. She returns home from college and begins to consistently hear voices. Confused, she acts violently, destroying her father's computer and offending his guests during a party. Her parents (Dave and Lynn) take her to the hospital, where she is diagnosed with schizophrenia. They refuse to believe that she has the disorder, however, blaming Nicole's behavior on her split with Jeff. They ignore the doctor's advice and take her back home, where she admits to her younger sister Lisa that she reacted the way she did because she heard voices and couldn't control herself. Nicole soon returns to college, reunites with Jeff and stops taking her prescribed medication.

Shortly, Nicole starts to hear voices again and becomes delusional. She ends up stopping her car in the middle of a road, stepping out of her car and panicking. Her parents agree to take her to the hospital, but are upset to find out that there is no cure, and respond angrily when she fights taking treatment. Lynn tries to force Nicole to take medication, but she refuses to, explaining that it makes her feel sick. However, without the medication, she has a relapse of her psychotic symptoms. Realizing what she is doing, she gives in on the pills and allows her mother to help her. Side effects include suffering from seizures, which pushes her to make the decision to quit using medication again. She pretends that she is taking the pills, but is caught by Lisa.

Nicole is upset to find out that her parents are constantly arguing over the way she should be treated. Meanwhile, Lisa feels neglected by their parents and says that she believes Nicole acts the way she does only to get attention. After a few more outbursts, destroying items with a knife and starting a small kitchen fire, Lynn sends Nicole to a mental institution. Dave is opposed to this, feeling that he is abandoning his daughter. Nicole still refuses to take pills, telling her psychiatrist that she would rather feel confused than to feel nothing at all. One night, she escapes from the institution and is nowhere to be found. During his search for her, Dave blames himself for what happened to her.

After two weeks without a trace of her, Nicole is arrested for having eaten at a diner without paying. She is questioned, but initially can't remember who she is. Lynn and Lisa finally pick Nicole up and take her home, but Dave refuses to talk to her and when Lynn confronts him about it, he responds that she is too sick to notice anyway. Meanwhile, Lisa is admitted to university, but she decides not to go, much to the distress of Lynn. When Lynn confronts her, Lisa admits that she is afraid that she may turn out the same way as Nicole, but Lynn assures her that that is not a likely possibility. In the end, Nicole tries to commit suicide by an overdose. She recovers and rebuilds her bond with her father, and Lynn and Dave finally decide to work together to help Nicole find a meaningful life.

== Cast ==
- Nancy McKeon as Nicole 'Nikki' Glover
- Valerie Harper as Lynn Glover
- Stephen Macht as Dave Glover
- Tricia Leigh Fisher as Lisa Glover
- Millie Perkins as Helen
- Robert Krantz as Jeff
- Jack Blessing as Dr. Dorfman
- Gerald Hiken as Dr. Austin
- Marta Kristen as Mona
- Fay Hauser
- Gary Bisig
- Robin Morse as Jenny
- Micah Grant as Kenny
- Heidi Schooler as Karen
- Nomi Mitty as Mrs. Linden
- William Wintersole as Referee
- Christine Avila as Advocate
- Frederick Ponzlov as Art Teacher
- Madeline Swift as Waitress
- Charles Walker as Security Officer
- Ethel Winant as Professor
- Molly McClure as Matron
- Gloria Camden as Schizophrenic Woman
- Robert Crow as Policeman
- Art Bradford as Coffee Shop Owner
