= Michael Lipton (actor) =

American film, stage and television actor

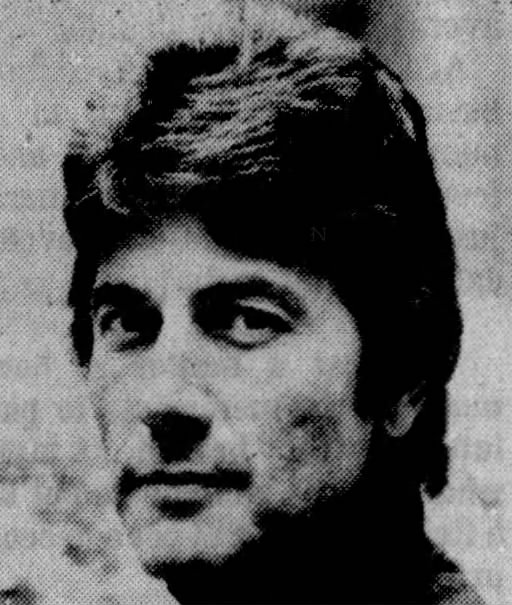
- Lipton in 1975
- Born: April 27, 1925; New York, U.S.
- Died: February 10, 2012 (aged 86); Englewood, New Jersey, U.S.
- Occupations: Film, stage and television actor

Michael Lipton (April 27, 1925 – February 10, 2012) was an American film, stage and television actor. He was best known for playing Dr. Stan Kurtz in the American soap opera television series Somerset from 1970 to 1976.

== Life and career ==
Lipton was born in New York. He served in the armed forces during World War II. He began his stage career in 1949, appearing in the stage play Caesar and Cleopatra. During his stage career, he appeared in the stage plays Wake Up, Darling and Inquest. For his performance in the stage play The Trigon, he won an Obie Award. He began his screen career in 1958, playing the recurring role of Ben Newcomb, a schoolteacher in the NBC western television series Buckskin. In 1959, he appeared in the television program The Restless Gun.

Later in his career, Lipton guest-starred in television programs including Wanted Dead or Alive, I Dream of Jeannie, The Defenders and Then Came Bronson. He played Neil Wade in the NBC soap opera television series Another World from 1962 to 1967, and played Dr. Stan Kurtz in its spin-off Somerset from 1970 to 1976. He also played Augustus Harper in the ABC soap opera television series One Life to Live in 1981. He also appeared in films such as A Man Called Adam, Network and Hercules in New York.

Lipton retired from acting in 1992, last appearing in the film Intent to Kill.

== Death ==
Lipton died on February 10, 2012, at the Lillian Booth Actors Home in Englewood, New Jersey, at the age of 86.
