= Hercules in New York =

1970 film by Arthur Allan Seidelman

- Theatrical release poster
- Directed by: Arthur Allan Seidelman
- Written by: Aubrey Wisberg
- Produced by: Aubrey Wisberg
- Starring: Arnold Stang; Arnold Schwarzenegger; Deborah Loomis; James Karen; Ernest Graves; Tanny McDonald; Taina Elg
- Cinematography: Leo Lebowitz
- Edited by: Donald P. Finamore
- Music by: John Balamos
- Production companies: Filmpartners (uncredited); RAF Industries
- Distributed by: RAF Industries
- Release date: February 25, 1970 (United States)
- Running time: 92 minutes
- Country: United States
- Language: English
- Budget: $300,000

Hercules in New York is a 1970 American independent fantasy action comedy film directed by Arthur Allan Seidelman and written by Aubrey Wisberg. It was released on home video under the title "Hercules Goes Bananas". It stars Arnold Schwarzenegger in his acting debut as the eponymous divine hero, who engages in escapades after traveling to New York City. Produced by Wisberg on a budget of $300,000 (equivalent to $1.92 million in 2025), the film was shot entirely on location.

== Plot ==
Hercules, at Olympus, berates his father Zeus for not allowing him to leave the gods' abode to adventure on Earth. Eventually, Zeus sends Hercules, on a beam, to the land of men.

After some strange encounters in the air and at sea, including scaring an old woman on a passenger jet, Hercules arrives in New York City, where hilarity ensues in the form of interactions with various New Yorkers, who regard him as physically superior but socially awkward. He befriends a skinny little man called Pretzie, named because he sells pretzels. Hercules becomes a successful professional wrestler.

Zeus, watching Hercules from the heights, becomes irritated with Hercules' antics, which he feels are making a mockery of the gods, and calls on Mercury to stop Hercules. After Mercury tries but fails to bring Hercules home, Zeus orders Nemesis to see to it that Hercules is consigned to the infernal regions ruled over by Pluto.

However, Juno instead convinces Nemesis to poison Hercules with a poison that would strip him of his divinity and then talk to Pluto. Nemesis informs Pluto of what is happening and he bets a large sum of money against Hercules in an upcoming strongman competition with Hercules' gangster manager. When Hercules loses the strongman competition his friends try to head off Hercules' angry manager's henchmen, but Hercules follows them to save them.

Meanwhile, Zeus uncovers the truth from Nemesis as to what is happening but only intervenes at the last minute to restore Hercules' divinity, not wanting any son of his to die at the hands of a mortal.

Hercules defeats the gangsters and realizes that he has been disobedient and returns to the heavens shortly after, only saying good-bye to Pretzie over a radio after he leaves.

In the heavens, Zeus tells Juno and Hercules that he will not punish Hercules for his behavior as they ask him about it and then asks to be left alone. They leave him alone, and upon their departure, Zeus sneaks out of the heavens and descends to Earth, scaring a passenger jet on his way down.

== Cast ==
- Arnold Stang as Pretzie
- Arnold Schwarzenegger (Note: credited as Arnold Strong 'Mr. Universe') as Hercules
- Deborah Loomis as Helen Camden
- James Karen as Professor Camden
- Ernest Graves as Zeus
- Tanny McDonald as Juno
- Taina Elg as Nemesis
- Michael Lipton as Pluto
- Harold Burstein as Rod Nelson
- Merwin Goldsmith as Maxie
- Michael McGreevey as Fat Lips
- George Bartenieff as Nitro
- Allen F. Collins as The Taxi Driver
- Rudy Bond as Ship Captain
- Dan Hamilton as Mercury
- Mark Tendler as Samson
- Dennis Tinerino as Atlas
- Richard Herd as Television Presenter
- Tony Carroll as Monstro
- Aubrey Wisberg as Agatha (uncredited cameo)
- Sam Stewart as Bear

== Production ==
Hercules in New York was the acting debut of Arnold Schwarzenegger, who was 22 years old. At the time he was living in Los Angeles and making ends meet by running a bricklaying business with fellow bodybuilder Franco Columbu, while weight training and participating in bodybuilding competitions. Schwarzenegger, who had expressed interest in pursuing an acting career, auditioned at the encouragement of his friend Reg Park, a successful bodybuilder who had starred in a series of successful "Hercules" films produced in Italy. According to Schwarzenegger, during his audition his agent said he had years of "stage" experience, implying theater, when he had only appeared on bodybuilding stages.

The film was also the directorial debut of Arthur Allan Seidelman, who up until then had only directed theatre. The film was independently produced on a low budget, and filmed entirely in real locations in New York City. Several scenes including an elaborate chariot chase were shot without permits.

Playing the film's title character, Schwarzenegger, because of his long last name and to play off the name of fellow cast member comedian Arnold Stang, is credited as "Arnold Strong 'Mr. Universe'". At the time filming began, Schwarzenegger had just come in first place in both professional and amateur Universe Championships. Production of the film coincided with his training for the competition for the second year in a row, and after it ended, he won the professional title again, beating Park.

Schwarzenegger had all his lines dubbed by an uncredited voice actor due to his thick Austrian accent, although the Trimark DVD has an "Original English Dialogue" audio track with Arnold's voice. However, in that version's final scene, Schwarzenegger's voice is not restored when Hercules speaks to Pretzie through his small transistor radio, since that scene was shot without Schwarzenegger present and the voice was added via ADR.

== Release ==
=== Copyright ===
On October 19, 2006, the San Francisco Chronicle reported that rightsholder Premiere Pictures was auctioning off the rights to the film on eBay for a minimum bid of $550,000.

== Reception ==
=== Critical response ===
On the review aggregator website Rotten Tomatoes, 14% of 7 critics' reviews are positive. Metacritic, which uses a weighted average, assigned the series a score of 23 out of 100, based on 4 critics, indicating "generally negative" reviews.

== See also ==
- List of American films of 1970
- Arnold Schwarzenegger filmography
- List of films featuring Hercules
