= Drive (Cheyenne Jackson song) =

Single by Cheyenne Jackson

from the album I'm Blue, Skies
- Released: 10 May 2012
- Recorded: 2012
- Genre: Pop
- Length: 4:05
- Songwriter(s): Cheyenne Jackson, Stephen "Stevie" Aiello
- Producer(s): Thomas "Tawgs" Salter

Drive is a song by American actor and singer Cheyenne Jackson from his album I'm Blue, Skies. Although Jackson has produced theatrical music releases, this was his first non-theatrical single. Drive was produced by Thomas "Tawgs" Salter and written by Jackson and Stephen "Stevie" Aiello. The song was also featured on Jackson's first-ever music video.

Jackson has discussed the meaning of the song:

I wanted to write a song about keeping forward momentum in your life, and having the strength to leave a situation that you know in your heart is bad for you. It ended up being melancholy, but ultimately hopeful and optimistic, just like me. I felt like my head was exploding, because not only did I know that this was exactly what I was supposed to be doing, it kind of changed my perspective on everything. The songs started pouring out of me, and I’m more proud of this work than any part I’ve ever done.

Drive was also remixed by Conair and appears as an additional 6:47 track on Jackson's album I'm Blue, Skies as "Drive (Conair mix)".

== Music video ==
An animated music video of the song directed by Austrian music video director Christian Hörlesberger was released. According to Jackson, the video — made of approximately 500 painstakingly hand-drawn and photographed cells — took four months to complete.

The mostly black-and-white video shows an illustrated Jackson driving along city streets, on a highway, and into the countryside. He is eventually chased by a police car, and in the last scene he whizzes away towards the sun on the horizon. This last scene is the only color sequence, except for the colors of the traffic lights and cars' headlights.

A special Drive (Behind the Scenes) video was released explaining the production process.

== Track listings ==
Single

1. Drive (4:05)
