= The Power of Two =

Studio album by Michael Feinstein, Cheyenne Jackson
- Released: November 3, 2009
- Recorded: 2009
- Genre: Traditional pop
- Length: 57:14
- Label: Harbinger Records
- Producer: Michael Feinstein, Cheyenne Jackson

Michael Feinstein chronology
The Sinatra Project (2008)	The Power of Two (2009)	Fly Me to the Moon (2011)

Cheyenne Jackson chronology
The Power of Two (2009)

The Power of Two is a 2009 studio album by American vocalists Michael Feinstein and Cheyenne Jackson arranged by John Oddo.

== Reception ==
Professional ratings
Review scores
Source	Rating
AllMusic	3/5 stars

The AllMusic review by William Ruhlmann awarded the album three stars and said "From the beginning, the two singers display a rapport, with Jackson, who has a more distinctive voice and a more natural performing style than Feinstein, helping his better-known partner loosen up and wail...Musically at least, Cheyenne Jackson is one of the best things that's ever happened to him."

== Track listing ==
1. "I'm Nothing without You" (Cy Coleman, Chris Zippel) - 3:20
2. "Me and My Shadow" (Dave Dreyer, Al Jolson, Billy Rose) - 3:31
3. "Old Friend" (Gretchen Cryer, Nancy Ford) - 4:17
4. "A Foggy Day" (George Gershwin, Ira Gershwin) - 3:04
5. "So in Love" (Cole Porter) - 4:47
6. "Old Devil Moon" (Yip Harburg, Burton Lane) - 2:53
7. "The Time Has Come" (Marshall Barer, Michael Leonard) - 4:05
8. "I'm Checkin' Out - Go'om Bye" (Duke Ellington, Billy Strayhorn) - 2:06
9. "The Power of Two" (Emily Saliers) - 4:53
10. "I'm Gonna Sit Right Down and Write Myself a Letter" (Fred E. Ahlert, Joe Young) - 2:44
11. "I Get Along Without You Very Well"/"Don't Get Around Much Anymore" (Hoagy Carmichael, Jane Brown Thompson)/(Ellington, Bob Russell) - 4:45
12. "We Kiss in a Shadow" (Oscar Hammerstein II, Richard Rodgers) - 3:50
13. "Salt and Pepper"/I'm Nothing Without You" (John Barry, Leslie Bricusse) - 2:25
14. "If I Can Dream" (W. Earl Brown) - 2:53
15. "Someone to Watch Over Me" (G. Gershwin, I. Gershwin) - 3:19

== Personnel ==
- Michael Feinstein - executive producer, piano, vocals, producer, vocal arrangement
- Cheyenne Jackson - executive producer, vocals, producer, vocal arrangement
- Tony Kadleck - flugelhorn, trumpet
- Bob Mann - guitar
- Dave Ratajczak - drums, percussion
- David Finck - acoustic bass, electric bass
- David Andrew Mann - clarinet, flute, tenor saxophone
- John Oddo - arranger, musical direction, piano, vocal arrangement
- Andy Brattain - associate engineer
- Karl Simone - cover photo, tray photo
- Scott Landis - photography
- Jim Czak - production engineer
