= The Sisters (2005 film) =

- Promotional movie poster
- Directed by: Arthur Allan Seidelman
- Screenplay by: Richard Alfieri
- Based on: The Sisters play by Richard Alfieri
- Starring: Maria Bello; Mary Stuart Masterson; Erika Christensen; Rip Torn; Elizabeth Banks; Eric McCormack; Chris O'Donnell; Steven Culp; Tony Goldwyn; Alessandro Nivola
- Cinematography: Chuy Chavez
- Edited by: Drake Silliman
- Music by: Thomas Morse
- Distributed by: Arclight Films
- Release dates: April 23, 2005 (Tribeca Film Festival); April 14, 2006 (United States)
- Running time: 113 minutes
- Country: United States
- Language: English
- Box office: $4,784 (Taiwan)

The Sisters is a 2005 film starring Maria Bello, Mary Stuart Masterson, and Erika Christensen as the title characters; it also stars Alessandro Nivola, Rip Torn, Eric McCormack, Steven Culp, Tony Goldwyn and Chris O'Donnell. The film was written by Richard Alfieri (based on his own play) and directed by Arthur Allan Seidelman.

The Sisters is inspired by Anton Chekhov's 1901 play Three Sisters. It tells the story of three sisters and a brother, their family dysfunctions, and the siblings dealing with their ups and downs after the death of their father.

== Cast ==
- Maria Bello - Marcia Prior Glass
- Erika Christensen - Irene Prior
- Elizabeth Banks - Nancy Pecket
- Eric McCormack - Gary Sokol
- Chris O'Donnell - David Turzin
- Mary Stuart Masterson - Olga Prior
- Tony Goldwyn - Vincent Antonelli
- Alessandro Nivola - Andrew Prior
- Rip Torn - Dr. Chebrin
- Steven Culp - Dr. Harry Glass

== Production ==
The film was shot on location in Eugene and Cottage Grove, Oregon.

== Reception ==
On review aggregator Rotten Tomatoes, the film holds an approval rating of 30% based on 27 reviews, with an average rating of 4.47/10. The website's critics consensus reads: "Shallow, dull, and ineffectively updated for modern audiences, The Sisters takes Chekhov's classic source material and renders it dramatically inert." On Metacritic, the film has a weighted average score of 40 out of 100, based on fourteen critics, indicating "generally favorable reviews".

The Los Angeles Times called it a "pompous, overwrought and itchingly claustrophobic psychodrama", saying "nothing can save the actors from the painfully mannered dialogue and implausible relationships." The New York Times said the film "ladles out almost two hours' worth of carping, backstabbing and egomania" which prompts the viewer to "quickly realize no one in this film is anyone you would want to spend two hours with" and "wonder why the heck they're spending so much time with one another."
