= Puerto Vallarta Squeeze =

Book by Robert James Waller

- Author: Robert James Waller
- Set in: Mexico
- Published: 1995

Puerto Vallarta Squeeze is a novel by Robert James Waller, which was made into a film in 2004. Originally published in 1995 and subtitled The Run for el Norte, this unlikely romance follows an American expatriate and his Mexican girlfriend on a road trip with a former Marine. The title itself may refer to the race-against-time journey that they take, which begins in Puerto Vallarta.

== Plot summary ==
Former journalist Danny Pastor has relaxed in Puerto Vallarta over the past year with María de la Luz Santos, a 22-year-old woman whom he'd first met as a cantina waitress. They moved in together shortly thereafter, and Luz asked Danny to marry her, but he kept her at arms' length. One night when Luz went off by herself, she got pregnant by a drunken college student. Danny paid for her to have an abortion, and that incident made up his mind about her.

One night as they relaxed in the El Niño cantina, Danny heard a gunshot and rushes outside to see two men dead. One was an American Navy officer, and the other was a software engineer ready to sell his company's work on failure analysis to the Taiwanese government. Back at their apartment, Danny and Luz met a man who identifies himself as "Peter Schumann" and needs to get north of the Rio Grande quickly. Paying Danny five thousand in cash, Schumann arranges his passage in a rusting Ford Bronco named Vito. The film adaptation featured a Jeep Wagoneer instead of a Ford Bronco.

Unaware at first of the nature of their journey, Luz wants to go with them to see her grandparents' graves along the coast. When she met with them for the trip, Luz wore blue jeans and a shirt that read "Puerto Vallarta Squeeze" with two halves of a lime dripping down the center. Danny saw in the story of this trip a great opportunity for a literary comeback. As they travelled north, Danny, Luz, and Schumann evade American military and Mexican authorities. Schumann later revealed that he's really former Marine sniper turned mercenary Clayton Price; he was commissioned to kill the engineer, but he took his job personally when he shot the naval officer. During the Vietnam War, Price was abandoned behind enemy lines by the officer who commanded the helicopter.

After commandeering the backroads of rural Mexico, Price arranged to have a helicopter meet him near an abandoned silver mine at Zapata. After a fiesta the night before, Luz decided to go with Price because she's fallen in love with him. As Price put it, "I'm not sure I'm capable of loving at all. But, Danny, you love too timidly. I'm not sure which is worse. You have this offhand way of treating her most of the time, as if she's a partially reformed street whore. . . . She told me about her past. She says I treat her with respect. You figure it out."

In a standoff with authorities, Price and Luz are killed. Danny heads back to Puerto Vallarta through Mazatlán, but he's arrested when the gun Price used in the double murder is found behind his apartment's toilet. Despite the evidence being circumstantial, Danny serves seventeen months of a ten-year prison sentence before he's released with a one-way ticket to Laredo. Although ordered never to return to Mexico again, Danny does so to find Price and Luz's graves in the Zapata cemetery. Price's marker was removed, but Danny exhumed Luz's coffin and reburied it in Celaya, where her grandparents were buried. During his time in prison, Danny wrote a manuscript about his adventures with Price and Luz as they rode north, but he never saw it again.

== Characters ==
- Clayton Price
- Walter McGrane
- Danny Pastor
- Maria de la Luz Santos
- Agent Neil Weatherford

== Miscellaneous ==
As an acknowledgment, the author claims he first heard this story from his wife, who heard it in Puerto Vallarta.

Characters from Waller's other novels make cameos in Puerto Vallarta Squeeze. When Luz flashes back to her childhood in Ceylaya, a gringo photographer bearing a strong resemblance to Robert Kincaid from The Bridges of Madison County takes photos of her working in the fields and sends her a copy of one. When Danny, Luz, and Price arrive in Zapata, Price gets a drink from the bar and barely recognizes another Marine. When the Marine goes off with his partner, he's referred to as "Jack" and is told to stop pining over "Linda". Carmine Jack and Linda Lobo are two prominent characters from Waller's novel Border Music.

Much of the background information of the character Price come from the real life Vietnam Era Marine Sniper Carlos Hathcock, whose legendary career in Vietnam has been the basis for 4 non-fiction novels. Several of Price's stories, told first hand, seem to come directly from Marine Sniper: 93 Confirmed Kills by Charles W. Henderson.

An interesting characterization of the "Killer" is that he is developed as a psychopath. He feels that he was abandoned as a child. He seems to justify his need to kill through some of rationization of those innate feelings.

== Adaptations ==
=== Motion picture ===
In 2004, Puerto Vallarta Squeeze was made into a motion picture. Adapted for the screen by Richard Alfieri, it was directed by Arthur Allan Seidelman, and starred Harvey Keitel, Scott Glenn, and Jonathan Brandis. Vikki Carr also appears and sings in Spanish.

=== Album ===
In 1996, Willie & Lobo compiled an album of their music, The Music of Puerto Vallarta Squeeze, to accompany the book. The artists' music is a blend of sounds, Gypsy, Latin, Celtic, Flamenco, Middle Eastern, Rock, Jazz, Cuban Swing, Tango and Salsa, loosely labeled New Flamenco.
