= Children of Rage =

1975 film

- Video release poster
- Directed by: Arthur Allan Seidelman
- Screenplay by: Arthur Allan Seidelman
- Based on: A story by Arthur Allan Seidelman and Ana Laura
- Produced by: George R. Nice
- Music by: Patrick Gowers
- Release date: 1975
- Running time: 106 mins
- Countries: Israel; United Kingdom

Children of Rage is a 1975 film written and directed by Arthur Allan Seidelman, filmed mostly in Malta. It deals with the conflict between Israelis and Palestinians in the late 1960s and early 1970s. The film stars Helmut Griem, Simon Ward, Cyril Cusack, Olga Georges-Picot and Richard Alfieri.

== Plot ==
When Ahmed, a Palestinian guerrilla, is killed, his brother Omar takes his place. Omar is wounded while disguised as an Israeli but escapes from the hospital to avoid questioning. Before being transported to the safety of the camps, he is treated by David, an Israeli doctor and friend of the family. David's conscience persuades him to go to the camp to help alleviate the suffering. The resistance he gets from some of the militants culminates in the death of him and Omar.

== Cast ==
- Helmut Griem as Doctor David Shalom
- Olga Georges-Picot as Leyla Saleh
- Richard Alfieri as Omar Saleh
- Simón Andréu as Ibrahim
- Cyril Cusack as David's father
- Robert Salvio as Abdullah
- Simon Ward as Yaacov
- Ronald Adam as Omar and Leyla's father
- Bernard Archard as Colonel Manik
- Gus Corrado as Walid
- Ethel Farrugia as UNWRA nurse
- Alessandro Haber as hospital orderly
- Mary Henry as woman at community centre
- Tony Jay as man at community centre
- Emiliano Redondo as Major Isaacs
- Roger Serbagi as Said
- Jacques Sernas as Doctor Ben-Joseph
- Sydney Tafler as Isaah
- Gabriele Tinti as Doctor Russnak

== Critical response ==
The film created quite a stir and controversy on its original release as it was the first Hollywood film to tackle the post 1967 Arab-Israeli conflict. According to the director, the Rugoff chain in New York thought they might suffer a bombing if they agreed to distribute the film.

Richard Wagner, reviewing it for Jump Cut website states, "Seidelmann’s film is, in effect, a cinematic Rorschach test to which people will respond depending on what they bring to it." New York film critic Mark A. Bruzonsky, a writer and consultant on international affairs living in Washington. D.C, described it as It is a shocking and absorbing portrayal of Middle East reality. Though admittedly espousing the theme of Palestinian homelessness through Israeli usurpation, the film is not the propaganda it is said to be by those who fail to appreciate the writer's artistry or motivations. For those viewers aware of the complex history of the Arab-Israeli tragedy, Children of Rage is a powerful presentation of the human dimensions of what transpires daily on both sides of the nationalist/cultural barrier.
