= Poor Murderer =

Play written by Pavel Kohout

- Written by: Pavel Kohout
- Original language: English

Premiere
- Date premiered: 20 October 1976
- Place premiered: Ethel Barrymore Theatre

Poor Murderer is a play written by Pavel Kohout that premiered at the Ethel Barrymore Theatre on Broadway on 20 October 1976 and closed on 2 January 1977 after 87 performances.

== Setting ==
The time is 1900, and it takes place in the great hall of the St. Elizabeth Institute for Nervous Disorders, St. Petersburg, Russia.

== Plot ==
The show follows a famous actor under treatment in a mental institution who wonders: did he really kill the actor playing Polonius as he was playing Hamlet, or was it only an illusion?

== Background ==
Poor Murderer was based on the Leonid Andreyev short story Mysl (Thought) and translated from the German version of G. and A. Baumrucker by Herbert Berghof and Laurence Luckinbill.

== Original production ==
The show was directed by Herbert Berghof, scenery and lighting Howard Bay, costumes Patricia Zipprodt, musical director Stanley Wietrzychowski, produced in association with Don Mark Enterprises, production stage manager Frederick A. deWilde, stage manager Harry Young, and press by Louis Sica and John Springer Associates Inc. The musicians were Stanley Wietrzychowski, Brian Koonin, and Alfonso Schipani.

The cast starred Larry Gates (Prof. Drzhembitsky), Laurence Luckinbill (Anton Ignatyevick Kerzhentsev, Hamlet), Kevin McCarthy (1st Actor, Alexey Konstantinovich Savelov, Polonius, Hamlet II), Maria Schell (1st Actress, Tatyana Nikolayevna, Queen), Paul Sparer (2d Actor, Ignat Antonovich Kerzhentsev, Rector, Waiter, Bernardo, Others), Ernest Graves (3d Actor, Dean, Lawyer, Maj. Count Byelitsky, Kurganov, King, Others), Peter Maloney (4th Actor, Cashier, Newspaper Vendor, Conductor, Gypsy, Francisco, Polonius II, Others), Julie Garfield (2d Actress, Servant Girl, Katya, Flower Vendor, Gypsy Roma, Marya Vassilyevna, Others), Ruth Ford (3d Actress, Voluptuous Waitress, Irina Pavlovna Kurganova, Countess Byelitskaya, Others), Felicia Montealegre (4th Actress, Slim Mistress, Duchess de Cliche-Turomel, Prologue, Others), and Barbara Coggin (Apprentice, Gypsy Girl).
