= Thomas Morse =

Composer

Thomas Morse is a composer of film and concert music.

== Life and composing career ==
He began his musical career while in high school, writing his first orchestral work. After receiving a bachelor's degree in composition from the University of North Texas, Morse began a composition master's degree at USC in Los Angeles, changing over to the film scoring program in the second year.

In the years that followed, Morse composed orchestral scores for more than a dozen feature films including The Big Brass Ring, based on an Orson Welles script, with William Hurt & Miranda Richardson who received a Golden Globe nomination for her performance; The Sisters (Maria Bello & Elizabeth Banks); and The Apostate (with Dennis Hopper), as well as the noted orchestral score for Jerry Bruckheimer's CBS series The Amazing Race.

Working parallel in the field of popular music, he created string arrangements on songs for numerous artists including a posthumous Michael Hutchence release entitled Possibilities.

In 2013 he signed a worldwide publishing agreement with Music Sales Group in New York, parent company of G. Schirmer.

== Notable music for film and television ==
Notable music for film and television:

- 2014 Come Back to Me
- 2005 The Sisters
- 2001–2005 The Amazing Race (69 Episodes)
- 2001 Lying in Wait
- 2000 The Apostate
- 1999 The Big Brass Ring

== Opera ==
- 2017 Frau Schindler

== Other works ==
- 2013 Code Novus (album)
