= I Love Liberty =

American television special

I Love Liberty was an American television special broadcast on ABC on March 21, 1982, as a patriotic variety show. The event was filmed in the Los Angeles Sports Arena on February 22, 1982, and was promoted as being a part of the commemoration of first U.S. President George Washington's 250th birthday. Created by Norman Lear and his organization People for the American Way, it was billed as a "salute to freedom".

Former U.S. Lady Lady Bird Johnson and former U.S. President Gerald Ford served as the event's co-chairs. Celebrity guests included Dionne Warwick, Helen Reddy, Desi Arnaz Jr., LeVar Burton, Kristy McNichol, Patty Duke, Jane Fonda, Burt Lancaster, Walter Matthau, Mary Tyler Moore, Dick Van Patten, and Christopher Reeve. Segments included The Muppets offering a comic reenactment of the Second Continental Congress and Barbra Streisand performing "America the Beautiful" with the U.S. Air Force Band; however, this was taped separately in England. Another notable moment from the special was a monologue Robin Williams delivered where he impersonated the U.S. flag. Washington Post television critic Tom Shales described I Love Liberty as "America's first left-wing patriotic rally". However, influential conservative Republican Barry Goldwater was also among the guests at event, having the role of introducing a production number which was performed by 1,600 people, including baton twirlers, unicyclists and five marching bands. The special would also posthumously feature a clip from conservative Republican actor John Wayne, who stated that while he disagreed with Jane Fonda, he believed she had the right to say what she believes.
