= Larry Gates =

American actor

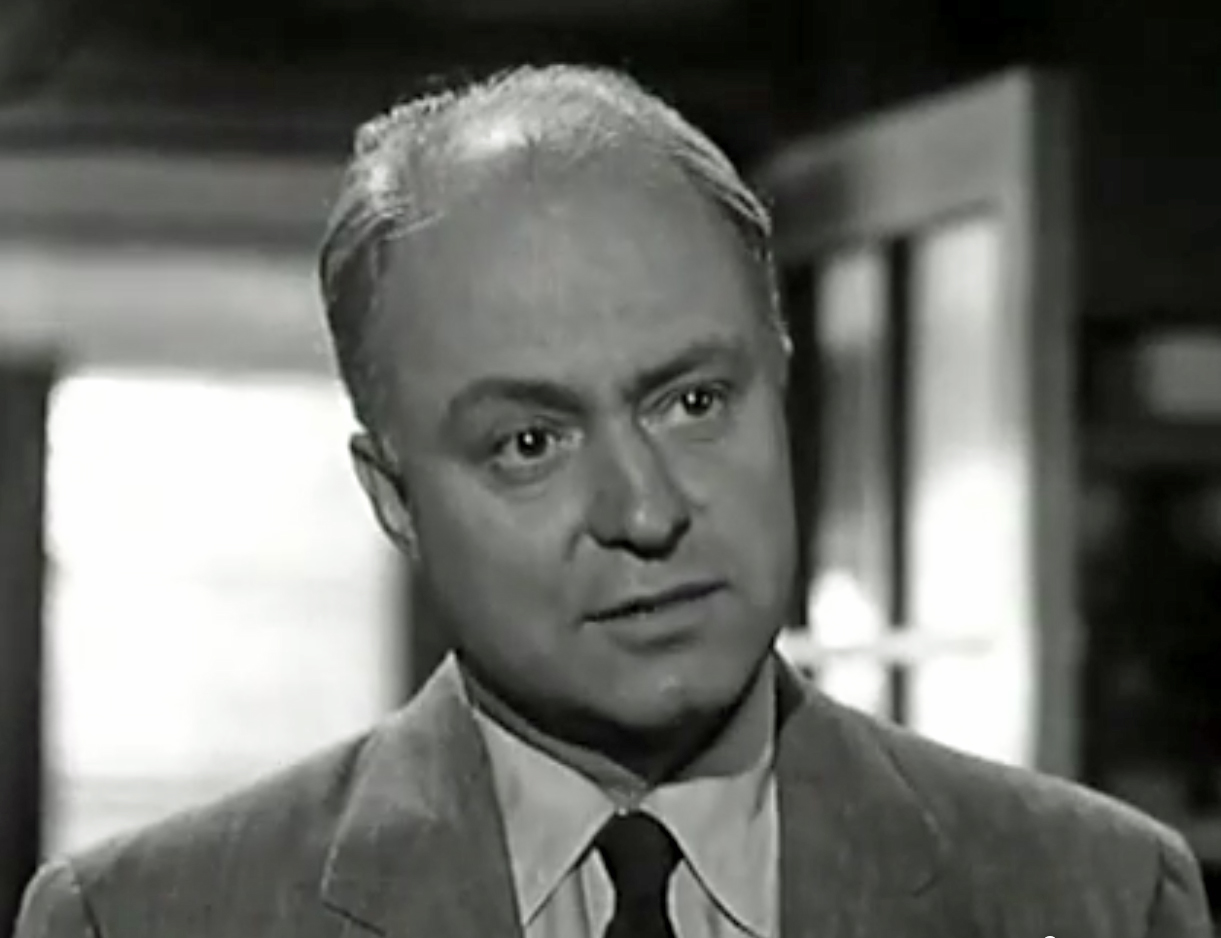
- Gates in trailer for Invasion of the Body Snatchers (1956)
- Born: Lawrence Wheaton Gates; September 24, 1915; St. Paul, Minnesota, U.S.
- Died: December 12, 1996 (aged 81); Sharon, Connecticut, U.S.
- Occupation: Actor
- Years active: 1952–1996
- Spouse(s): Tania Wilkof (1959 - ?); Judith Gates (m. 19??; his death 1996)

Lawrence Wheaton Gates (September 24, 1915 – December 12, 1996) was an American actor.

His notable roles include H.B. Lewis on daytime's Guiding Light and Doc Baugh in the film version of Cat on a Hot Tin Roof (1958). He played the role of H.B. from 1983 to 1996 and won the Daytime Emmy for Outstanding Supporting Actor at the 1985 awards. (He had previously played the role of District Attorney Eric Van Gelder on Guiding Light in 1977 and 1978.)

Gates may be best remembered for his role in the 1967 film version of In the Heat of the Night, where his character Eric Endicott is part of a famous scene involving him slapping Sidney Poitier's face and getting slapped in return.

== Early years ==
Gates was born in Saint Paul, Minnesota. As a chemical engineering student at the University of Minnesota, he acted in student plays. Some of his early acting experience came at the Barter Theatre in Abingdon, Virginia. His interest in acting led him to change his collegiate focus, and "he ultimately concluded his college career with a speech major".

== Career ==
Gates had a long career in film, television, and theater. He appeared in the Broadway productions of The Taming of the Shrew (1950), The Teahouse of the August Moon (1953), The Carefree Tree (1955), Bell, Book and Candle (1956), The Highest Tree (1959), A Case of Libel (1964), and First Monday in October (1978). Gates played Polonius opposite Sam Waterston in a New York revival of Hamlet. He starred in the 1976 Broadway play Poor Murderer, which is about an actor who questions whether or not he, who is playing Hamlet, actually killed the actor playing Polonius, or if it was just a dream.

His films included Has Anybody Seen My Gal (1952), Francis Covers the Big Town (1953), The Girl Rush (1955), Invasion of the Body Snatchers (1956), The Strange One (1957), The Brothers Rico (1957), Some Came Running (1958), Cat on a Hot Tin Roof (1958), The Remarkable Mr. Pennypacker (1959), One Foot in Hell (1960), Underworld U.S.A. (1961), The Young Savages (1961), Ada (1961), Toys in the Attic (1963), Cattle King (1963), The Sand Pebbles (1966), In the Heat of the Night (1967), Hour of the Gun (1967), Death of a Gunfighter (1969), Airport (1970), Lucky Luciano (1973), and Funny Lady (1975).

On television, Gates had numerous roles on such anthology drama series as The Philco Television Playhouse, Alfred Hitchcock Presents, The Twilight Zone, Goodyear Television Playhouse, Kraft Television Theatre, Studio One, and Playhouse 90. He continued to make dozens of guest appearances in a wide variety of primetime series, including Bonanza, The F.B.I., Route 66, The Defenders, Rawhide, and Twelve O'Clock High. He played the role of Secretary of State Dean Rusk in the 1974 teleplay The Missiles of October, and played President Herbert Hoover in the 1979 miniseries Backstairs at the White House.

== Recognition ==
In 1964, Gates was nominated for a Tony Award in the category Actor, Supporting or Featured (Dramatic), for his work in A Case of Libel.

== Personal life and death ==
Gates married Tania Wilkof in Huntington, Connecticut, on August 2, 1959. At the time of his death, he was married to Judith Gates. He died on December 12, 1996, in a Sharon, Connecticut, hospital, aged 81.

== Filmography ==
- Glory Alley (1952) - Dr. Robert Ardley
- Has Anybody Seen My Gal (1952) - Charles Blaisdell
- Above and Beyond (1952) - Captain William 'Deak' Parsons, USN
- Francis Covers the Big Town (1953) - Dan Austin
- Take Me to Town (1953) - Marshal Ed Daggett
- The Girl Rush (1955) - Hap Halliday
- Invasion of the Body Snatchers (1956) - Dr. Dan 'Danny' Kauffman
- The Strange One (1957) - Major Avery
- Jeanne Eagels (1957) - Al Brooks
- The Brothers Rico (1957) - Sid Kubik
- Cat on a Hot Tin Roof (1958) - Dr. Baugh
- Some Came Running (1958) - Professor Robert Haven French
- The Remarkable Mr. Pennypacker (1959) - Reverend Dr. Fielding
- One Foot in Hell (1960) - Doc Seltzer
- Alfred Hitchcock Presents (1961) (Season 6 Episode 25: "Museum Piece") - Mr. Hollister
- The Twilight Zone (1961) (Season 3 Episode 3: "The Shelter") - Bill Stockton
- The Great Impostor (1961) - Cardinal
- The Hoodlum Priest (1961) - Louis Rosen
- Underworld U.S.A. (1961) - John Driscoll
- The Young Savages (1961) - Randolph
- Ada (1961) - Joe Adams
- The Spiral Road (1962) - Dr. Kramer
- Cattle King (1963) - President Chester A. Arthur
- Toys in the Attic (1963) - Cyrus Warkins
- The Sand Pebbles (1966) - Jameson
- In the Heat of the Night (1967) - Eric Endicott
- Hour of the Gun (1967) - John P. Clum
- Death of a Gunfighter (1969) - Mayor Chester Sayre
- Airport (1970) - Commissioner Ackerman
- Lucky Luciano (1973) - Judge Herlands
- Funny Lady (1975) - Bernard Baruch
- Leonard Part 6 (1987) - Medusa Guard
