= Willie & Lobo =

US musical group

Willie & Lobo was a musical duo composed of William Robert "Willie" Royal, Jr. (violin) and Wolfgang Hubert "Lobo" Fink (guitar). Their music, characterized as New Flamenco and World Music, is a blend of Gypsy, Latin, Celtic, Flamenco, Middle Eastern, Rock, Jazz, Cuban Swing, Tango and Salsa.

The duo produced 11 albums, mainly on the Narada label. They have also been included in at least three compilations of Guitar and Flamenco music. Their album, Gypsy Boogaloo, spent 17 weeks on the Billboard's World Music Chart in 1993, 10 weeks in the number two position . Their album Zambra spent 3 weeks Billboard's New Age Album chart in 2006, peaking at number 4.

Their music has been called the Flamenco equivalent of smooth jazz by Chris Nickson, a reviewer on allmusic.com. Tom Phalen of the Seattle Times found it fiery and frantic: "Although the basis is flamenco, it can go in a half-dozen directions at any time. Mostly it's about strong, involving instrumental melodies and having fun." Gypsy Boogaloo, their best charting album, was called one of the best exotic musical dishes of the early '90s by Jonathan Widran of the All Music Guide.

== History ==
Willie Royal, Jr. was born in El Paso, Texas, the son of an Air Force lieutenant colonel. His father's job took young Royal over the world including Turkey, Germany and France. At the age of eight he began classical violin lessons, quickly becoming proficient enough to become the concertmaster of his high school orchestra. Inspired by the music of Jean-Luc Ponty, Stephane Grappelli and It's A Beautiful Day, as well as sitting in with Gregg Allman and Dickey Betts, Willie traveled the world, absorbing numerous musical styles before moving to Mexico in the '80s.

Wolfgang "Lobo" Fink was born in the Bavarian town of Teisendorf. At 18, while in the German navy, he picked up his first guitar. Listening to an album by gypsy guitarist Manitas de Plata drew him to the music. Upon leaving the navy, he found de Plata in a gypsy camp in Southern France and spent a while with him and his people. Returning to Germany, Lobo formed a flamenco group named Lailo, touring Europe for three years and helping to popularize the modern gypsy sound. His searches led him to Granada, Spain, living with gypsies in the caves of Sacromonte and studying their ways. He traveled to Mexico in 1980 as a solo act.

The pair first met in San Miguel de Allende, in Mexico, where they were both working at Mama Mia's restaurant. Willie on fiddle and Lobo on flamenco guitar jammed on occasion, searching for an individual sound. The owner of a local bar they were both playing at suggested they perform together.

Virtually one listen or one concert was all it took for many fans to become lost in their sound, which Royal described as somehow sounding like it was made by four musicians instead of two.

Royal died following complications from Alzheimer's in 2016.

== In popular culture ==
=== Characters in novel ===
In 1996 the novel Puerto Vallarta Squeeze, by Robert James Waller, was released. Waller, a fan of the duo's music, wrote Willie and Lobo into the story. The Willie and Lobo CD, The Music of Puerto Vallarta Squeeze was released at the same time and includes tracks from their albums Gypsy Boogaloo, Fandango Nights and Between the Waters.

== Discography ==
=== Studio albums ===
- Gypsy Boogaloo (1993)
- Fandango Nights (1994)
- Between the Waters (1995)
- Caliente (1997)
- Wild Heart (1999)
- Siete (2000)
- Mañana (2003)
- Zambra (2006)
- Willie and the Locos (2010)
- Playing Hard: The Original (2011)
- Lobo 1985 (2013)
- Huapangos Toreros (Wolfgang "Lobo" Fink, Gil Felipe Gutierrez, Tyler Mitchell) (2013)

=== Live albums ===
- Live In Concert (2001)

=== Compilations ===
==== Solo compilations ====
- The Music Of Puerto Vallarta Squeeze (1996)
- Gypsy Romance: Exotic Flamenco Guitar and Violin (2005)

==== With other artists ====
- Guitar Music For Small Rooms (1997) (WEA)
- Gypsy Passion: New Flamenco (1997) (Narada)
- Gypsy Fire (2000) (Narada)
- Discover Narada (2000) (Narada)
- Narada Guitar 2: The Best of Two Decades (2000) (Narada)
- Best of Narada New Flamenco Guitar (2003) (Narada)

== See also ==
- New Flamenco
- Flamenco rumba
- Johannes Linstead
