= Six Dance Lessons in Six Weeks =

2001 play by Richard Alfieri

- Theatrical poster for the world premiere season in 2001
- Original language: English
- Written by: Richard Alfieri
- Characters: Michael Minetti; Lily Harrison
- Subject: ageism, intolerance
- Genre: comedy, drama
- Setting: St. Petersburg Beach, Florida; Early 21st century (prior to Obergefell v. Hodges ruling in 2015)

Premiere
- Date: 7 June 2001
- Place: Geffen Playhouse, Los Angeles
- Official website

Six Dance Lessons in Six Weeks is a 2001 play by American playwright Richard Alfieri. It is a play with only two characters: Lily Harrison, the formidable widow of a Baptist minister, and Michael Minetti, a gay and acerbic dance instructor hired to give her dancing lessons. It premiered at the Geffen Playhouse in Los Angeles (with Uta Hagen and David Hyde Pierce in its two roles) before moving to Broadway. It has gone on to performances in 24 countries and been translated into 14 languages.

== Synopsis ==
Lily Harrison is a self-described "tight-arsed old biddy" living alone in St Petersburg Beach on the gulf coast of Florida. As the play opens, she is waiting for her first of six weekly in-home dance lessons. Her tutor is Michael Minetti, an acerbic gay man who has been forced by circumstances to leave his life as a chorus boy on Broadway and to take work as a dance instructor. Lily is Michael's first client, and their first lesson does not go well owing to his foul language and the fact that both are bitter. Each lies to the other, Lily claiming her husband is soon coming home (in fact, she is a widow whose life was cramped by her Southern Baptist Minister husband), and Michael claiming to be married, to hide both his homosexuality and the pain of his lover's death. As the lessons continue, an improbable friendship develops out of their shared testiness and solitude. It becomes clear that Lily did not need lessons but rather a dance partner, and the pair enjoy time together outside of their lessons. The friendship grows to the point where Lily is playing match-maker for Michael, and Michael is caring for Lily as her health deteriorates.

== Notable productions ==
Arthur Allan Seidelman directed the play for its 2001 premiere in Los Angeles at the Geffen Playhouse (with Uta Hagen and David Hyde Pierce) and for the 2003 season at the Coconut Grove Playhouse in Miami (with Rue McClanahan and Mark Hamill). Polly Bergen took over the role of Lily when the production moved to Broadway. Seidelman also directed productions in the West End of London (with Claire Bloom and Billy Zane) in 2006 and the Los Angeles revival (with Constance Towers and Jason Graae) in 2008. A 2014 Laguna Playhouse production starred Leslie Caron and David Engel.

The play has also been translated into 14 languages and been performed in cities including Amsterdam, Athens, Berlin, Bielefeld, Bonn, Budapest, Düsseldorf, Essen, Hamburg, Helsinki, Istanbul, Jerusalem, Johannesburg, Madrid, Magdeburg, Munich, Prague, Salzburg, São Paulo, Seoul, Strasland, Stuttgart, Tel Aviv, Tokyo, and Vienna. According to Variety, the play has been produced widely, and the publisher Concord Theatricals (formerly known as Samuel French Inc.) describes it as an "extremely popular" play which has "enjoyed tremendous success both nationally and internationally." The play's website describes it as "an international hit and one of the most produced plays in the world."

The play was produced in Australia in 2006 by the Ensemble Theatre under then-artistic director Sandra Bates, pairing Todd McKenney in his first non-musical play with Nancye Hayes. The pair reprised these roles ten years later, reuniting with Bates in her final directorial role. As of 2016, it is the most successful play in the theatre's 58-year history. The Ensemble Theatre, in collaboration with Christine Dunstan Productions, took the play on tour and won the 2007 Helpmann Award for Best Regional Touring Production.

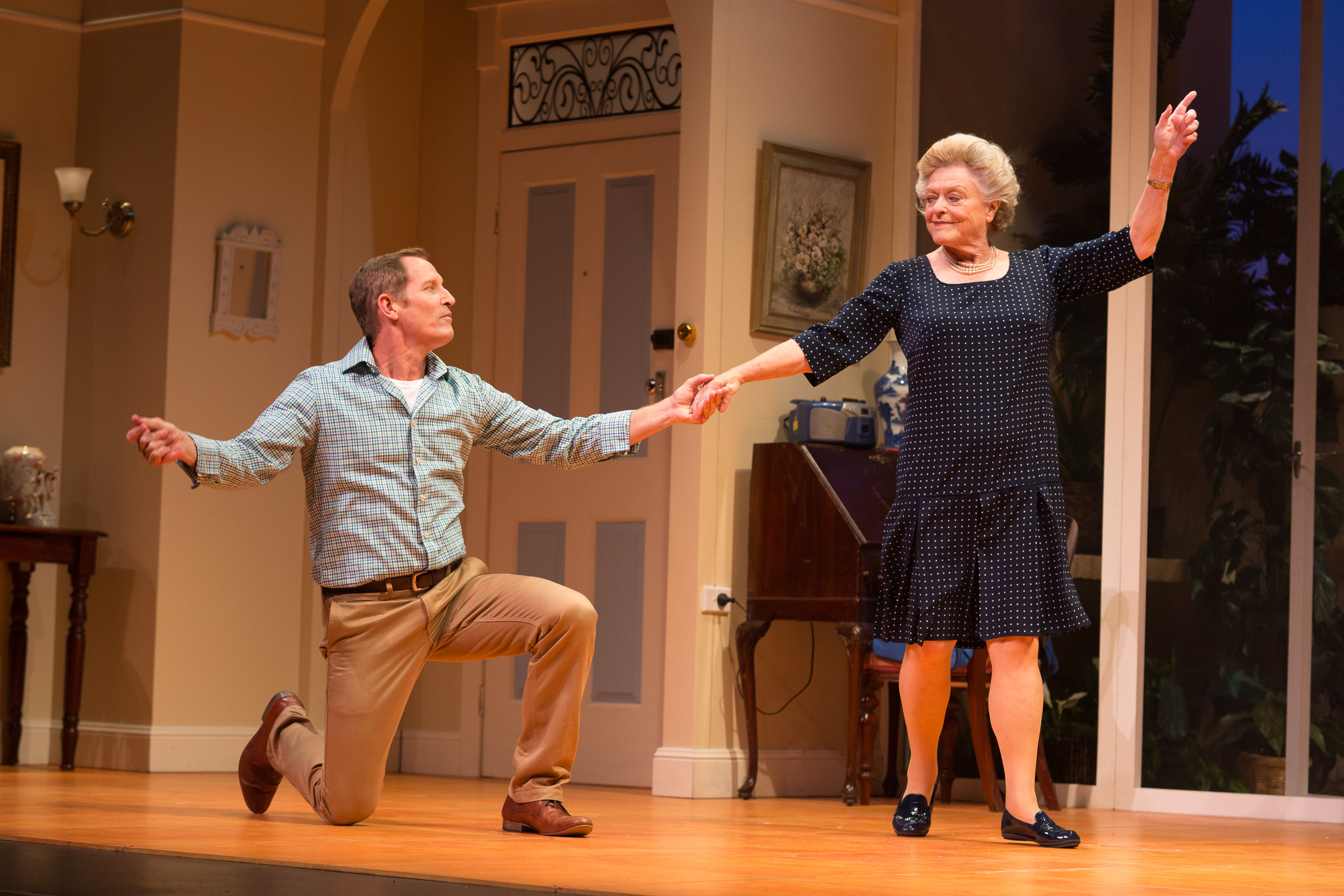
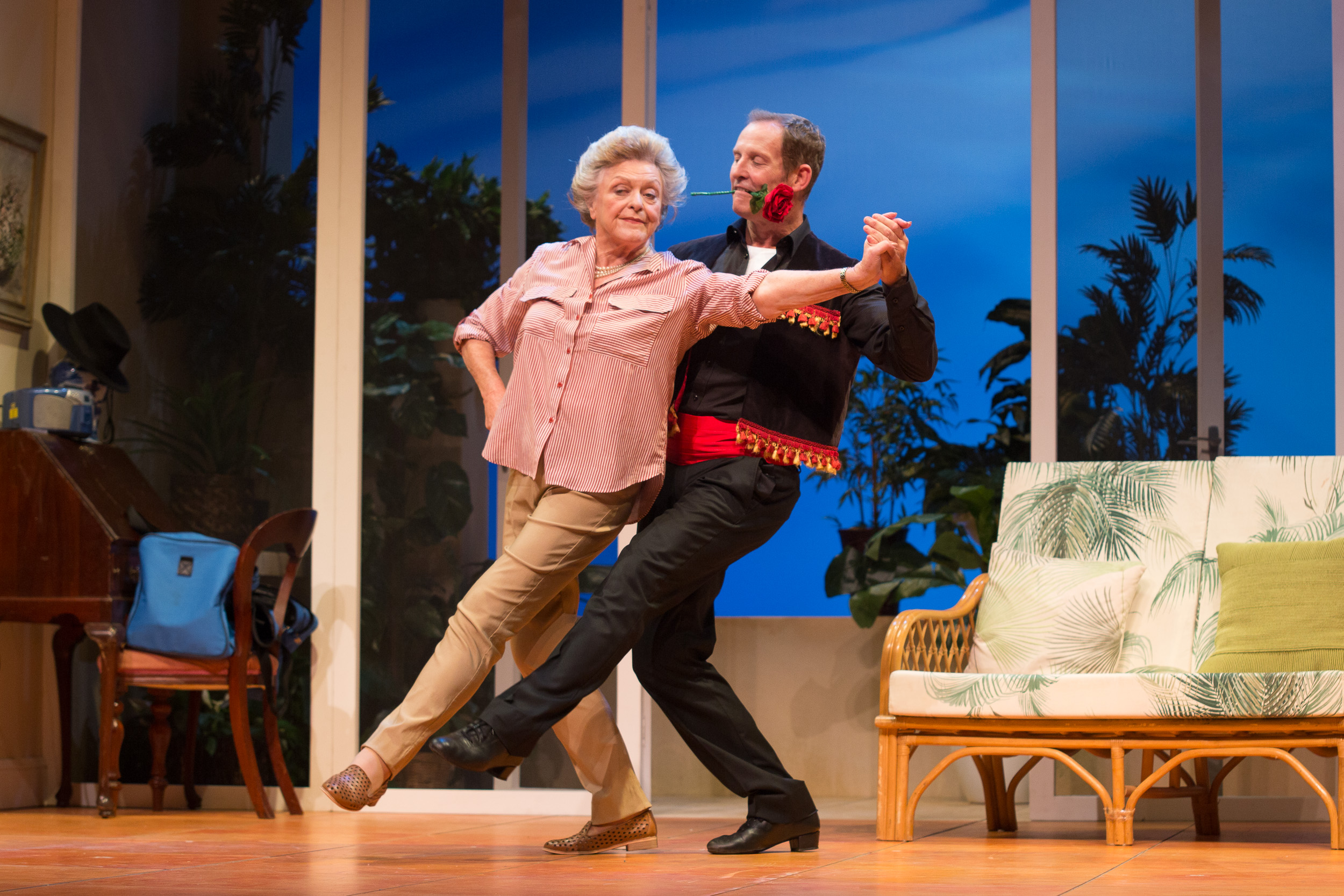
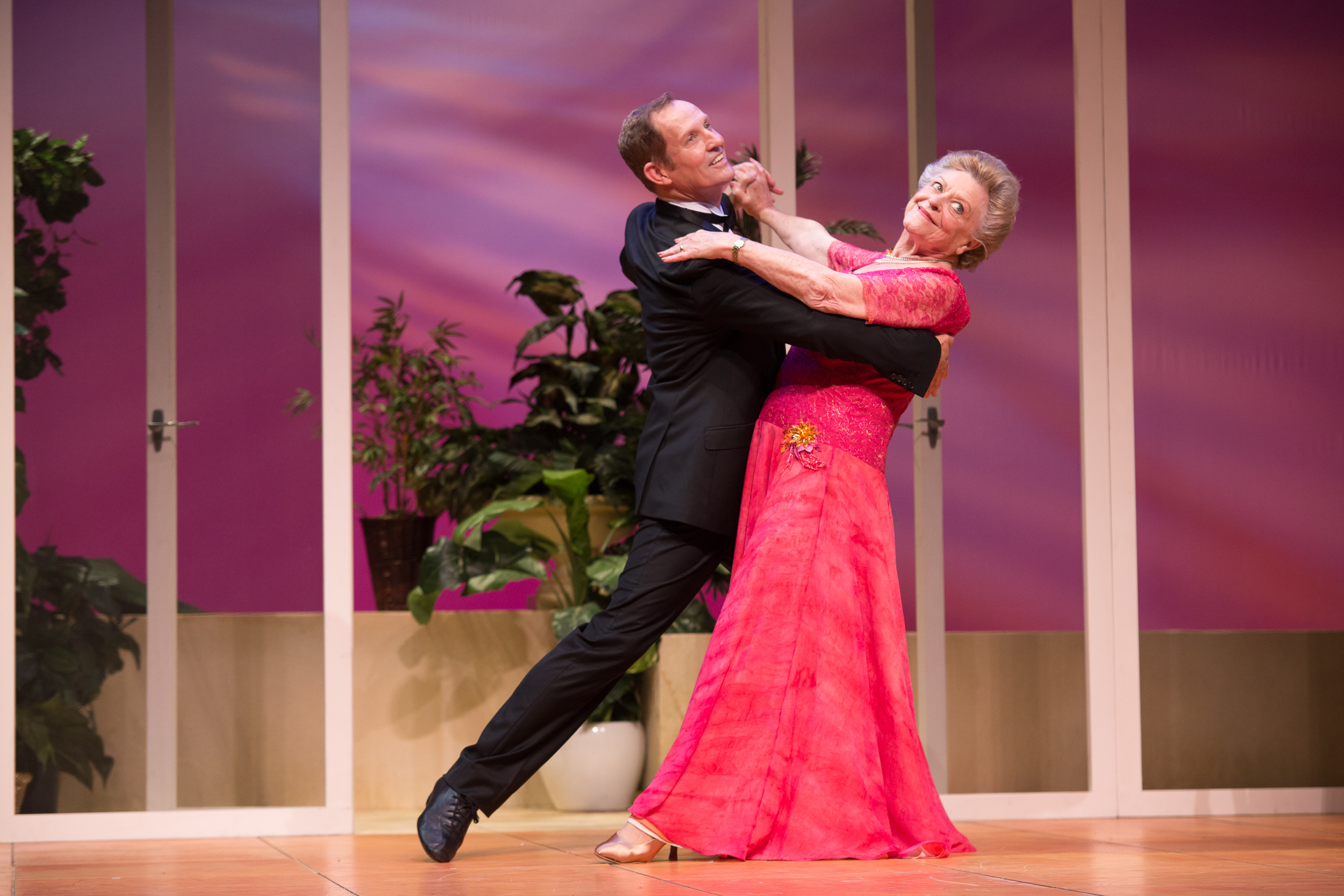
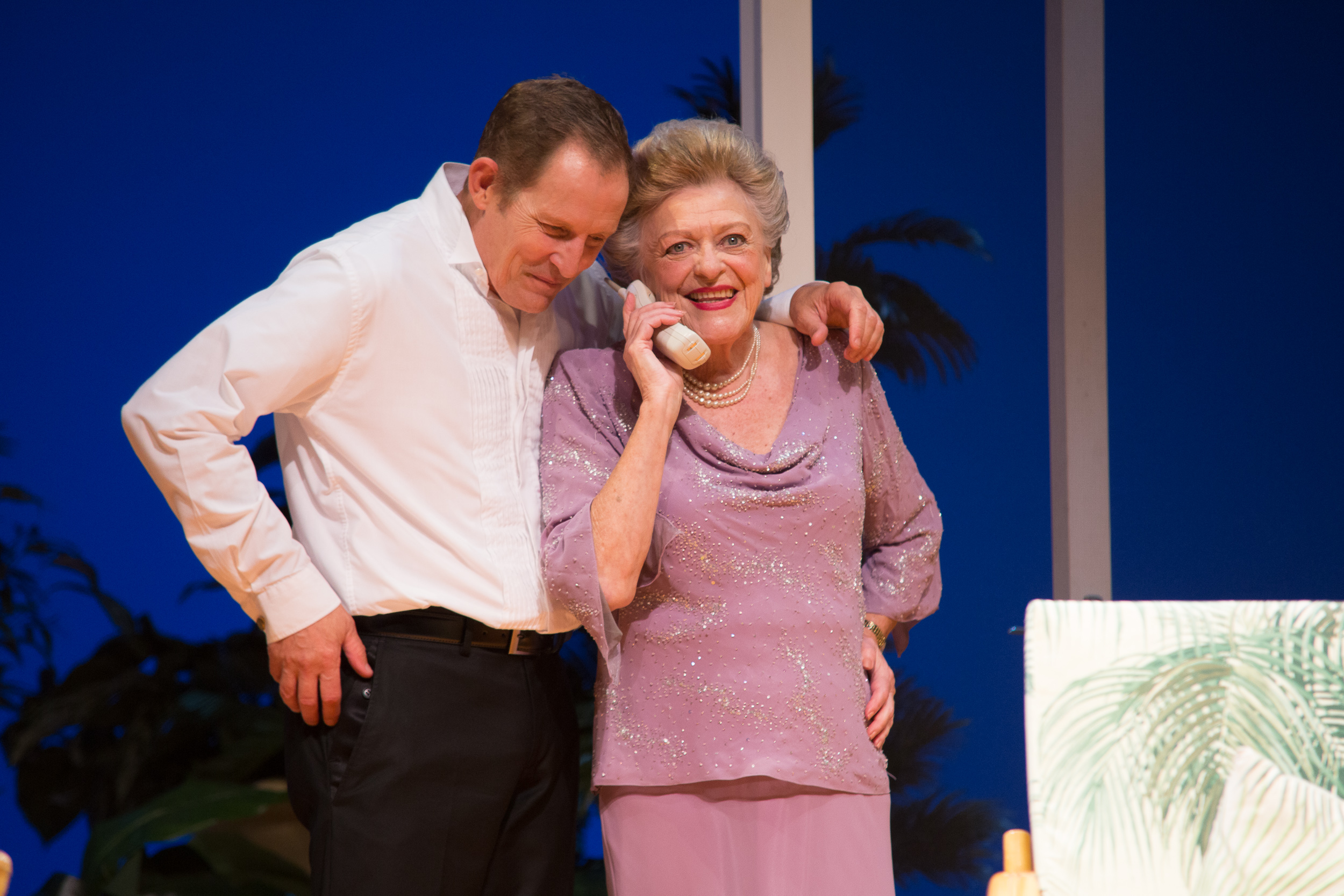
Todd McKenney and Nancye Hayes performing together in Six Dance Lessons in Six Weeks – dancing the swing (top left), tango (top right), and waltz (bottom left) – photos by Clare Hawley from the 2016 Ensemble Theatre production at the Concourse Theatre, Chatswood

== Adaptations ==
Alfieri developed Six Dance Lessons in Six Weeks into a screenplay for the 2014 film adaptation, which was directed by Seidelman and starred Gena Rowlands and Cheyenne Jackson. Review aggregator Rotten Tomatoes reports that the film has an overall approval rating of 50%, based on 12 reviews, with a weighted average rating of 5.3/10. Metacritic, which assigns a normalised rating to reviews from mainstream critics, gave the film an average score of 50 out of 100, based on eight critics, indicating "mixed or average reviews".

== Manuscript ==
- Alfieri, Richard (2005). Six Dance Lessons in Six Weeks. Concord Theatricals. ISBN 9780573602795.
