= Spokane Civic Theatre =

Non-profit theatre in Spokane, Washington

- Interactive map of Spokane Civic Theatre
- Address: 1020 N. Howard St. Spokane, WA 99201; United States
- Coordinates: 47°40′1.35″N 117°25′13.99″W
- Owner: Spokane Civic Theatre
- Capacity: 336 (main stage), approx. 85 (studio)
- Type: Community Theatre

Construction
- Opened: 1967; 59 years ago
- Architect: Moritz Kundig

Website
- www.spokanecivictheatre.com

Spokane Civic Theatre is a nationally recognized non-profit theatre located in Spokane, Washington. Incorporated in 1947, the theatre is one of the oldest community theatres in the country. In recent years, the theatre has been brought to a level of excellence that has resulted in many awards. The theatre's mission is "to foster an enduring love for live theatre in every community member." Civic, as it is fondly called by the surrounding community, sets a high standard for theatre in the Spokane area.

== General ==
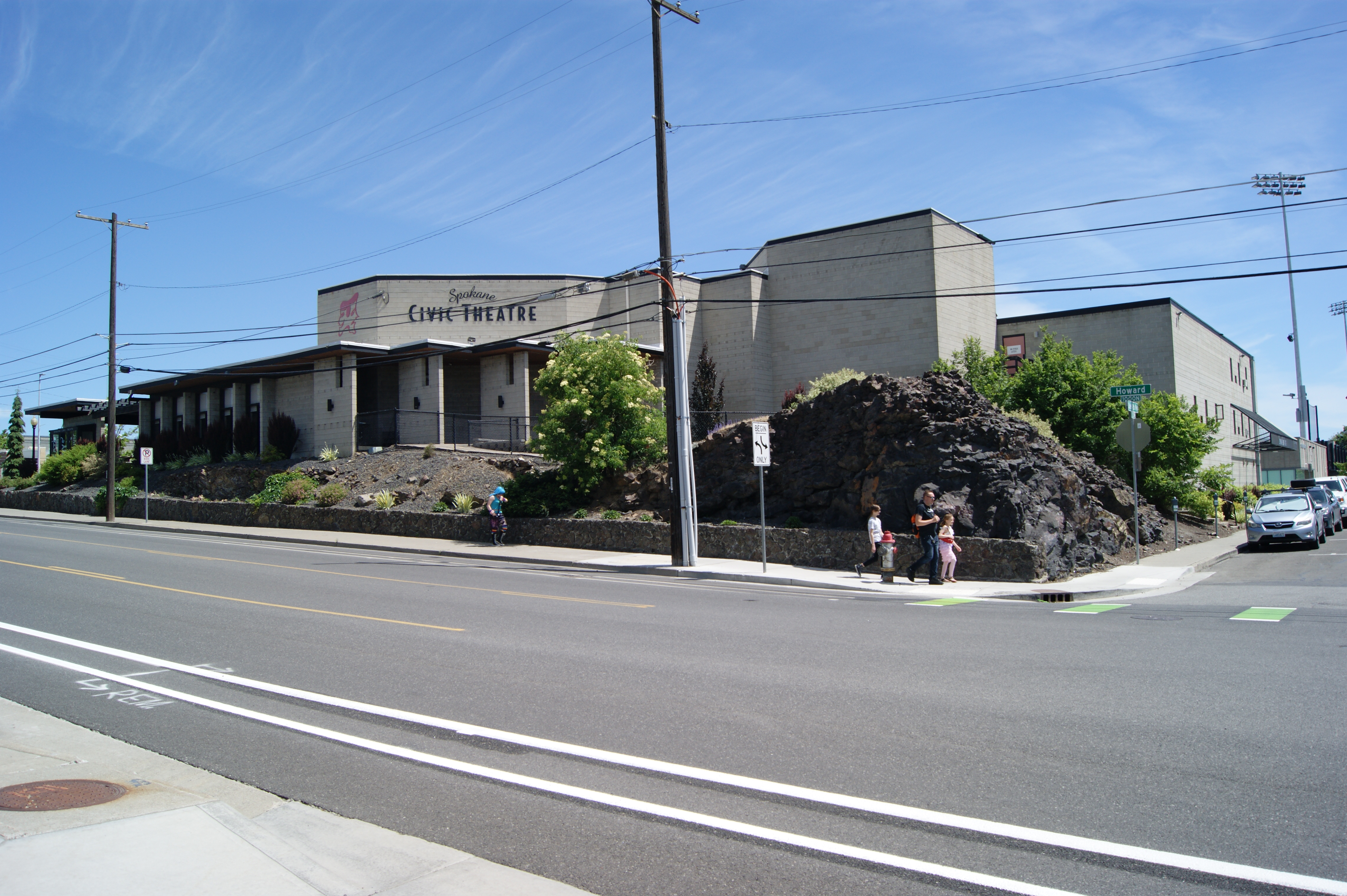
Spokane Civic Theatre building

Spokane Civic Theatre is one of few community theatres that owns its own building and land. The building was built in 1967 in the Brutalist style on a $250,000 budget and designed by architect Mortiz Kundig, who referred to the theater job as "a plum of a commission" and the building as "one of my best buildings". The present facility houses two performance spaces: The Margot and Robert Ogden Main Stage Theatre and The Firth J. Chew Studio Theatre. The Main Stage auditorium is a proscenium theatre with a seating capacity of 334, while the Studio theatre is a small, black box theatre seating approximately 85. The seating in the Studio theatre can be moved, which allows specific productions to fill the space in a new way, like the 2011 production of Metamorphoses, which housed a pool. Both stages are wheel-chair accessible, and the Main Stage also provides Sennhiser infra-red assistive listening devices and a Hearing Loop system (installed in 2014) for patrons with hearing disabilities. The backstage area houses a scene shop, sewing room, storage for props, a fully furnished green room, offices and dressing rooms. Children under the age of five, including infants, are not allowed into performances as a courtesy to other patrons.

== History ==
As one of the oldest community theatres in the country, Spokane Civic Theatre is a point of pride for the city. Incorporated in 1947, performances were held in other facilities at first, including the old Post Theater and, beginning in 1957, the Riverside Playhouse. The present facility was opened in 1967. In 1972, a three-story addition was made, adjoining to the backstage area of the main theatre. This space was used for set construction, rehearsals, the costume shop, and offices for the continued upkeep of the theatre. The lower levels of the theatre, previously used as rehearsal space, were converted into a studio theatre in 1979. It was named for long-time volunteer Firth J. Chew in 1989. Currently, it is used as a black box theatre, and many of the smaller or experimental productions take place there. In 2013, the Main Stage Women's restroom was expanded and a new Donor Lounge & Meeting Room was added onto the building.

In addition, Civic used to be home to the Box and Hat Players, a performance troupe devoted to spreading a love of musical theatre to community members of all ages. Spokane Children's Theatre also used Civic's stage at one time.

== Education ==
Civic serves as a resource for local high school and college theatre departments. It also operates a theatre school for all ages. Civic provides a variety of workshops in acting, directing, voice, dance, stage combat and technical theatre. The Academy reaches approximately 700 students per year, 100 of them taking more than one class.

The fall, winter and spring quarters run eight weeks beginning in late September, late January, and mid-April. Each class meets one day a week. The Academy also runs summer camps for those going into K-12, where students come each weekday during the morning or the afternoon. The grade school summer program uses a play-in-a-week format, rendering familiar stories like The Lord of the Rings, Harry Potter, the Legend of Zelda, Star Wars and The Chronicles of Narnia into simple and fun performances. For the 7-12th grade students, there are three classes throughout the summer: a two-week Musical Theatre camp, a two-week Drama camp, and a 3-4 week Musical Performance camp.

In Summer 2011 the Musical Performance camp for the students entering grades 7-12 was changed. It was originally a program focused on finding the individual talents of each actor involved and bringing them together into a fun, original musical. The program became more like a summer stock performance, where the students have 3–4 weeks of rehearsals in which to fully memorize their lines, choreography, and music. The success of their 2011 production of Footloose cemented the change in the program.

Each year, there are Theatre Intensives for school age students to perform. The Intensive format includes a couple weeks of rehearsal each day culminating in a ticketed performance. The proceeds from the performance go toward the Scholarship Fund.

Spokane Civic Theatre's Academy program also runs a scholarship program for the many students in the community who possess a love of theatre without the ability to fund a whole week at camp. Thanks to the generous contributions from the community, many scholarships have been provided to qualifying families with the over $15,000 raised per season. The community's need for scholarship has increased from approximately 10% to 30%.

== Community Involvement ==
Spokane Civic Theatre has approximately 500 volunteers who serve as actors, backstage crews, front of house, house managers, and board members. They contribute an estimated 90,000 hours every year. Volunteers return to Civic time and time again, supporting the theatre's endeavors. In addition to volunteering their time, the Spokane community has given incredible amounts in the form of donations that support the theatre and its mission.

Civic provides over 600 Main Stage tickets to help various other community organizations and individuals with their auctions and fundraisers. Civic also presents benefit performance nights for other not-for-profit groups, reaching 4,500-6,000 individuals. Many of these individuals have never been to Civic or a live stage production before.

In the fall of 2011, Civic launched the Shakespeare in Schools community outreach program. The program is free for Middle and High School students and teachers and is taught by Civic's Director of Education. Shakespeare in Schools this 2013-14 season has reached approximately 750 students and 16 teachers at 7 schools. During the fall of 2013, the Academy tested a pilot program called Creative Dramatics with the focus on Elementary school students/teachers; it received an enormous response (serving approximately 350 students, 14 teachers, and 9 schools) and will become a full program, like the Shakespeare in Schools.

For the first time in March 2014, Civic and the Spokane Symphony joined forces to present a two evening performance of the theatre's earlier hit production of Les Misérables live at the Martin Woldson Theatre at the Fox. The joint fundraiser for the three community organizations exceeded their expectations.

== Awards ==
Spokane Civic Theatre holds approximately 150 local, state, regional, and national awards for community theatre from the Inlander's Spokie awards to the American Association of Community Theatres' (AACT) Festival.

At the 2011 AACTFest, Spokane Civic Theatre's production of The 25th Annual Putnam County Spelling Bee received two awards and three nominations. The awards were for Lacey Bohnet as Best Supporting Actress and Nancy Vancil for Best Musical Accompaniment. Nominations were in the areas of Best Lighting Design, Best Supporting Actor, and Best Ensemble.

Civic has also been recognized by the city of Spokane in 2007, when then Technical Director Peter Hardie was recognized for continued artistic excellence, and Resident Director Troy Nickerson for volunteering abundant talent and resources to help raise funds for many Spokane area non-profits.
