= Richard Alfieri =

American dramatist

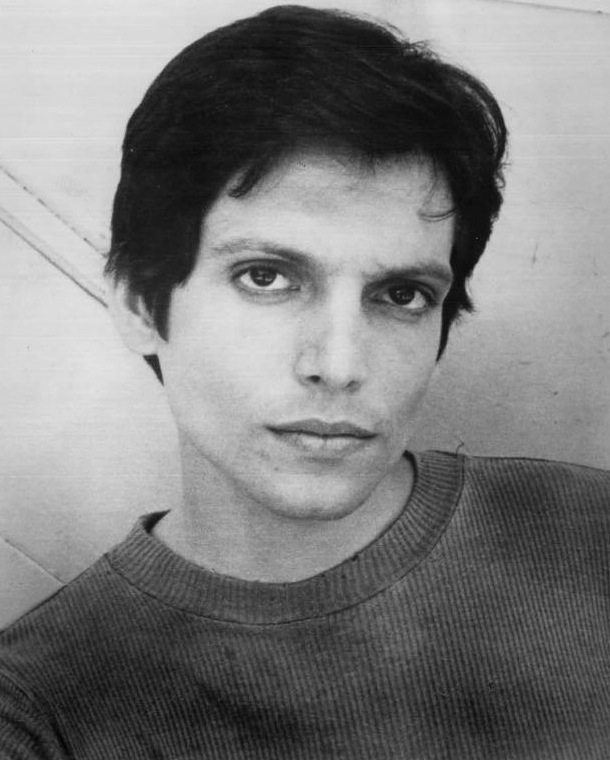
- Alfieri in 1975
- Born: April 9, 1948 (age 78); Florida, United States
- Education: Yale University
- Occupations: Playwright; screenwriter; novelist; producer; actor

Richard Alfieri (born April 9, 1948) to Sam and Nena Alfieri is an American playwright, screenplay writer, novelist, film producer, and actor. His awards include two Writers Guild Awards and an Emmy nomination.

== Career ==
A graduate of Yale University, Alfieri began his professional career in New York City, where he studied with Sanford Meisner at the Neighborhood Playhouse.

Alfieri's first professional acting role was as Matt in The Fantasticks at the Rochester Music Theater.

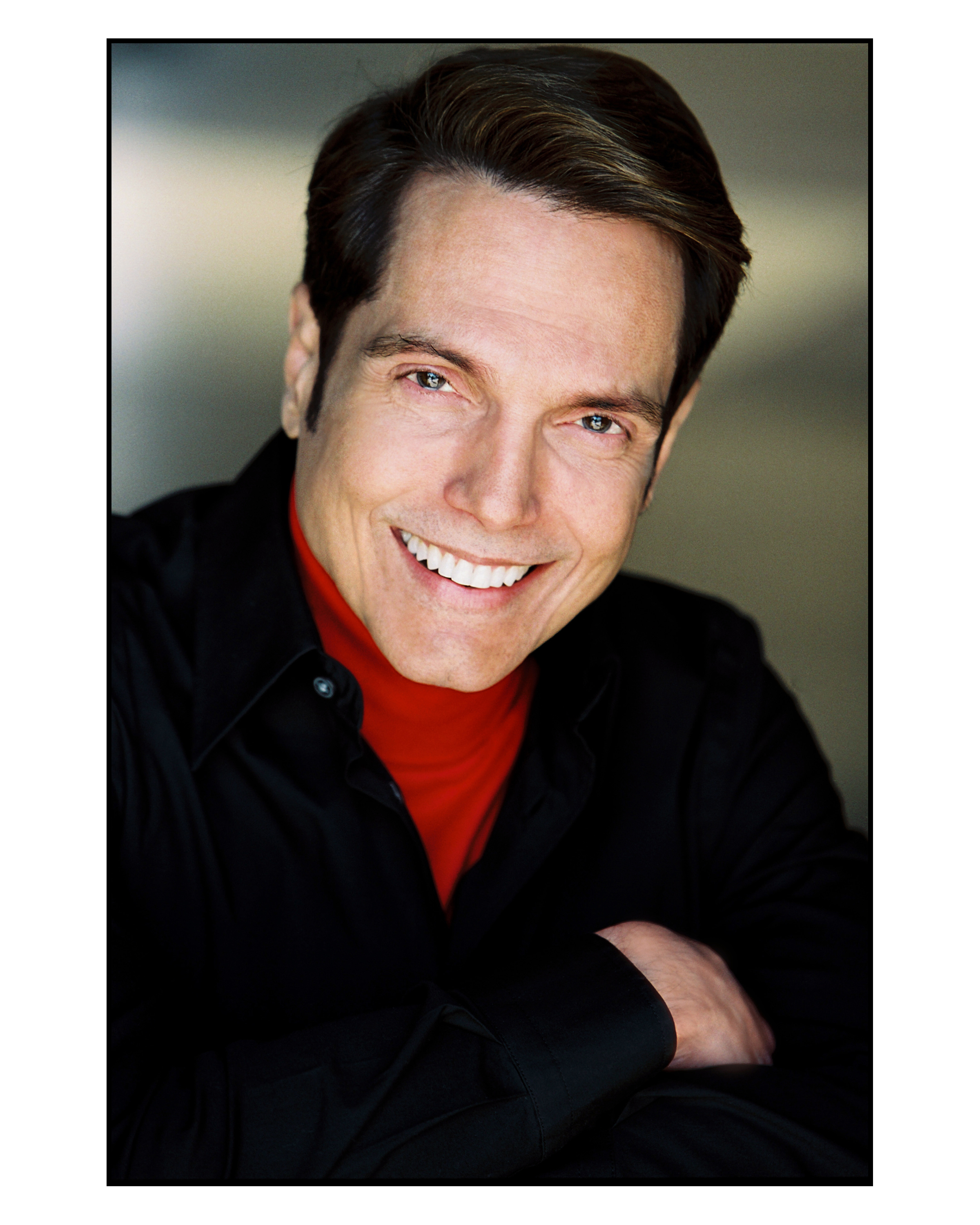
Alfieri in 2006

He later starred on Broadway in Tennessee Williams' Vieux Carre, and off-Broadway in Awake and Sing and The Justice Box. His film-acting credits include Children of Rage and Echoes, and he has appeared in episodes of Magnum PI, Trapper John, M.D., and Stories from the Bible.

Alfieri received a Writers Guild Award for the Hallmark Hall of Fame film Harvest of Fire. He won the Grand Prize at the New York Film and Television Festival and a Writers Guild Award nomination for his teleplay for the film A Friendship in Vienna. He also received both a Writers Guild Award and an Emmy Award nomination for his work on Norman Lear’s ABC special I Love Liberty. He wrote the feature film Echoes and the novel Ricardo - Diary of a Matinee Idol, which he adapted into the screenplay Moonlight Blonde. He also wrote the film adaptation of Robert James Waller's novel Puerto Vallarta Squeeze. His play "The Sisters", suggested by Anton Chekhov's Three Sisters, premiered at the Pasadena Playhouse. Alfieri adapted the play for feature-film production, and the film appeared as an Official Selection at the Tribeca Film Festival and Hollywood Film Festival. Alfier's most-recent play, Revolutions, premiered at the Barter Theatre.

Alfieri produced the feature film Rescue Me and executive-produced the NBC film False Witness.

His play Six Dance Lessons in Six Weeks opened on Broadway at the Belasco Theater starring Polly Bergen and Mark Hamill. The play premiered in Los Angeles in 2001 where it set records at the Geffen Playhouse in a production starring the legendary Uta Hagen in her last role. It has since been translated into 14 languages and opened in over 24 countries with productions in cities including Berlin, Sydney, Melbourne, Vienna, Madrid, Tokyo, Tel Aviv, Jerusalem, Amsterdam, Budapest, Helsinki, Prague, Istanbul, Hamburg, Munich, Athens, Seoul, Johannesburg, and London. In Australia, it was performed in 2006 by Todd McKenney and Nancye Hayes and became the most successful play in the Ensemble Theatre's 58-year history. Other international stars who have played the leading role of Lily include Leslie Caron, Constance Towers, Claire Bloom, Loretta Swit, Elke Sommer, Lola Herrera, Miriam Zohar, Mitsuko Kusabue, and The Kessler Twins. Alfieri adapted Six Dance Lessons in Six Weeks into a feature film starring Gena Rowlands, which was released in 2014.

== Works ==
=== Plays ===
- Six Dance Lessons In Six Weeks, 1st Produced: Geffen Playhouse, Los Angeles, USA, 2001, Samuel French, Inc., New York (2005) ISBN 978-0-573-60279-5
- The Sisters, which premiered at the Pasadena Playhouse
- Starstruck
- Revolutions

=== Screenplays ===
- The Sisters
- Puerto Vallarta Squeeze (2004)
- Six Dance Lessons in Six Weeks (2014)

=== Teleplays ===
- Harvest of Fire (1996) (TV)
- A Friendship in Vienna (1988) (TV)

=== Writer ===
- Echoes (1983)
- I Love Liberty (1982) (TV)

=== Novels ===
- Ricardo - Diary of a Matinee Idol (1989)
