= Spike Jones (disambiguation) =

Spike Jones (1911–1965) was an American bandleader and comic musician.

Spike Jones may also refer to:

- Spike Jones (American football) (born 1947), punter
- Spike Jones Jr. (born 1949), American television producer/director

== See also ==
- Spike Jonze (born 1969), film and music-video director
- Spike Jones in Stereo, a 1959 comedy album by Spike Jones
