= Judy Strangis =

American actress

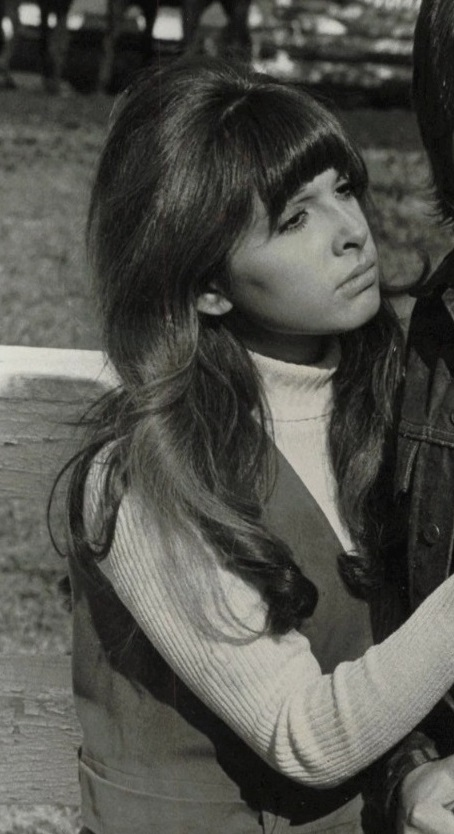
- Born: December 23, 1949 (age 76); Los Angeles County, California, U.S.
- Education: University High School
- Occupation: Actress
- Years active: 1957–1994
- Known for: Role of Helen Loomis in Room 222; Role of Judy / Dyna Girl in Electra Woman and Dyna Girl
- Spouse: Jayson Sher (m. 1987)
- Relatives: Helen Grayco (aunt)

Judy Strangis (born December 23, 1949) is an American former actress. She was born to Sarafino "Sam" Strangis, an immigrant from Italy who worked as a truck driver, and Carmella (née Greco) Strangis, a homemaker. She is best known for her roles in two ABC television series: Room 222 (1969–1974) and Electra Woman and Dyna Girl (1976–1977).

== Early years ==
Judy Strangis was born in Los Angeles County, California, and attended University High School in West Los Angeles.Strangis is a niece of Spike Jones, a 1940s band leader, comedian, TV star, and RCA Victor recording artist; and of singer Helen Grayco.

Her brother Sam would become a director, producer, and studio executive. Her sister Linda (known professionally as Cindy Malone) would become a singer and actress.

== Career ==
=== Acting ===
Strangis made her film debut at age 7, in the 1957 movie Dragoon Wells Massacre. For the next 27 years, she was regularly cast in small and guest-starring roles in television shows.

In 1969, Strangis was cast as high school student Helen Loomis in the ABC show Room 222. She played this role for four years.

In 1976, she was cast as the sidekick superheroine DynaGirl in the Saturday morning TV show Electra Woman and Dyna Girl, co-starring with Deidre Hall. Her nephew, writer/producer Greg Strangis, wrote two episodes in this series.

Other appearances include roles on The Spike Jones Show (Jones was her uncle), The Twilight Zone ("The Bard"), The Mod Squad ("Outside Position"), and Bewitched. Strangis appeared twice as an extra on Batman; her brother Sam Strangis was a production manager on the show. Strangis appeared in the TV movies All My Darling Daughters (11/22/1972) and My Darling Daughters' Anniversary (11/08/1973). She appeared in a season 4 episode of Love American Style, "Love and the Mind Reader" (03/02/1973), and also appeared in a first season episode of Barnaby Jones, "Sing a Song of Murder" (04/01/1973). Strangis appeared in a season 3 episode of CHiPs, "Kidnap" (01/26/1980), and a season 5 episode, "Moonlight" (10/18/1981). In 1984, she guest-starred in an episode of The A-Team, "In Plane Sight".

=== Voice-overs ===
Strangis began doing voice-overs for Saturday morning cartoons in 1972 with William Hanna and Joseph Barbera's The Roman Holidays, followed by Butch Cassidy in 1973, and Wheelie and the Chopper Bunch in 1974. She continued performing cartoon voice-overs for the next 10 years for series including Goldie Gold and Action Jack, Saturday Supercade and MoonDreamers.

=== Advertisements ===
From 1974 to 1975, Strangis was a pitchwoman for Chrysler Corporation in the role of "Mean Mary Jean". Wearing a football jersey and short denim hot-pants, she promoted the Plymouth Duster, Plymouth Volare, and Plymouth Road Runner models and often appeared at Chrysler promotions and auto shows around the country.

In 1976, Strangis became a pitchwoman for Mattel's Barbie product line.

== Personal life ==
Strangis married Jayson Sher in 1987.

== Filmography ==
=== Film ===
Year	Film	Role	Notes
1957	Dragoon Wells Massacre	Susan	Credited as Judy Stranges
1960	Pay or Die!	Marissa Rossi	(uncredited)
1970	Like It Is		

=== Television ===
Year	Title	Role	Notes
1959	Westinghouse Desilu Playhouse		Episode: "So Tender, So Profane"
1961	The Untouchables	Arlene	Episode: "The Lily Dallas Story"
1961	The Barbara Stanwyck Show	Little Big Mouth	Episode: "Little Big Mouth"
1961	The Spike Jones Show	Lady MacBeth	Episode: "Summer Show #1"
1962	Going My Way	Maria	Episode: "A Man for Mary"
1963	The Twilight Zone	Cora	Episode: "The Bard"
1966	Batman	Girl #1, Teenager	2 episodes
1970	Bewitched	Sandra	Episode: "Serena Stops the Show"
1970	Dan August	Susie	Episode: "Murder by Proxy"
1971	Congratulations, It's a Boy!	Riva	ABC Movie of the Week
1972	Women in Chains	Junkie	ABC Movie of the Week
1972	The Mod Squad	Robin Keller	Episode: "Outside Position"
1972	Medical Center	Cindy	Episode: "Wall of Silence"
1972	All My Darling Daughters	Robin	ABC Movie of the Week
1972	The ABC Saturday Superstar Movie	Sue	Voice, episode: "Tabitha and Adam and the Clown Family"
1972	The Roman Holidays	Groovia	Voice, 3 episodes
1970-1973	Love, American Style	Phyllis / Lana	3 episodes
1973	Barnaby Jones	April Dayton	Episode: "Sing a Song of Murder"
1973	My Darling Daughters' Anniversary	Robin	ABC Movie of the Week
1973	Butch Cassidy	Merilee	Voice, 13 episodes
1974	Wheelie and the Chopper Bunch	Rota Ree	Voice, 13 episodes
1969-1974	Room 222	Helen Loomis	70 episodes
1976	Barbary Coast	Mary Ellen Masters	Episode: "Mary Had More Than a Little"
1976	Electra Woman and Dyna Girl	Judy / Dyna Girl	16 episodes
1977	Eight Is Enough	Noreen	Episode: "Yes Nicholas, There is a Santa Claus"
1978	Loose Change	Judy Berenson	Miniseries
1981	The Misadventures of Sheriff Lobo	Stewardess Kelly	Episode: "Airsick"
1980-1981	CHiPs	Karen Costello / Sharon	2 episodes
1981	Goldie Gold and Action Jack	Goldie Gold	Voice, 13 episodes
1982	Not Just Another Affair	Dee Courso	Television film
1983	Saturday Supercade	Pauline	Voice, 4 episodes
1984	The A-Team	Judy Rogers	Episode: "In Plane Sight"
1984	ABC Weekend Special	Diedra	Voice, episode: "Bad Cat"
1984	Matt Houston	Amy	Episode: "The High Fashion Murders"; credited as Judith Strangis
1986	Moon Dreamers	Additional Voices	3 episodes
1986-1987	My Little Pony	Additional Voices	10 episodes
1987	The Real Ghostbusters	Tour Guide / Babysitter	Voice, uncredited
1994	Batman: The Animated Series	Tammy Vance	Voice, episode: "Baby-Doll"
1999	Where Are They Now?	Dyna Girl	Episode: "Superheroes"

== Awards and nominations ==
Year	Award	Category	Nominated work	Result
1987	14th Daytime Emmy Awards	Outstanding Writing in a Children's Special (shared with Alan L. Gansberg)	CBS Schoolbreak Special	Nominated
2004	2nd TV Land Awards	Superest Super Hero (shared with Deidre Hall)	Electra Woman and Dyna Girl	Nominated

== Sources ==
- Jankiewicz, Pat (September 2003). "DynaGirl Forever". Starlog (314).
- Martindale, David (1998). Pufnstuf & Other Stuff: The Weird and Wonderful World of Sid & Marty Krofft. Renaissance Books. ISBN 978-1-58063-007-8.
- Erickson, Hal (1998). Sid and Marty Krofft: A Critical Study of Saturday Morning Children's Television 1969-1993. McFarland Company. ISBN 978-0-7864-0518-3.
