= Dinner Music for People Who Aren't Very Hungry =

Dinner Music For People Who Aren't Very Hungry

Studio album by Spike Jones
- Released: 1956
- Recorded: 1956
- Genre: Comedy
- Label: Verve
- Producer: Spike Jones

Dinner Music For People Who Aren't Very Hungry - Spike Jones Demonstrates Your Hi-Fi was the first long-playing release by comedic bandleader Spike Jones.

Released in 1956 by Verve Records under catalog number MG V-4005, the album is an unusual mix of Jones' ongoing (and offbeat) commentary on the relatively new technology of high fidelity audio combined with then-new recordings of some of his classic comedy numbers, again in a high fidelity format. ("Cocktails for Two" and "Chloe" were dubbed from 1940s' Standard Transcriptions and re-equalized for hi-fi, according to Jones' archivist Ted Hering).

The liner notes, written by noted composer and conductor Dimitri Tiomkin, speak of the aforementioned virtuosity of Jones' musicians. They also list the rather broad range of "instruments" heard on the album in their order of appearance. Among them were a "burpaphone," "assorted belches," "garbage disposal grinding up violin" and something called a "poontangaphone." He quotes an article from the Chicago Daily News of August 30, 1956: "Spike Jones got into the Michigan Boulevard repair act Wednesday. Turned up on a curbstone at 7:00 A.M. with Bill Putnam of Universal Recording, plus one tape recorder; gravely recorded the noise of a pneumatic drill to be added to a Spike Jones Dinner Music Album."

Tiomkin was also bold enough to make the claim that one of the tracks was "one of the greatest examples of musicianship ever recorded." That track was The Sneezin' Bee, based on Flight of the Bumblebee. Considered possible only on flute, violin or piano, the number was recorded a tempo and in real time on trombone by guest artist Tommy Pederson, with former Slicker pianist Frank Leithner contributing the sneezes.

The album was released on compact disc October 25, 1990 on Rhino Records.

== Track listing ==
Side A

1. "Space Ship Landing" - credited as being from the motion picture "The Mole People Versus MCA."
2. "Assorted Glugs, Pbrts & Skks"
3. "Ramona"
4. "Duet for Violin and Garbage Disposal" a.k.a. "Mischa's Souvenir"
5. "Black & Blue Danube Waltz"
6. "Stark's Theme"
7. "The Old Sow Song" (vocals: George Rock)
8. "Pal-Yat-Chee" (vocals: Betsy Gay)
9. "How High the Fidelity"
10. Cocktails for Two (lead vocal: Carl Grayson)

Side B

1. "Wyatt Earp Makes Me Burp" - with Mousie Garner (as Sir Frederic Gas) and The Sons of the Sons of the Pioneers.
2. "Woofer's Lament"
3. "Memories Are Made of This?" - with Gil Bernal and The Canine 9
4. "The Sneezin' Bee" (trombone solo: Tommy Pederson; piano: Frank Leightner)
5. "Little Child" (vocals: George Rock)
6. "Brahm's Alibi" (vocals: Lou Singer and Spike Jones)
7. "Chloe" (vocals: Red Ingle)
