= Donald Yetter Gardner =

American songwriter (1939-2004)

- Born: August 20, 1913; Portland, Pennsylvania, U.S
- Died: September 15, 2004 (aged 91); Needham, Massachusetts, U.S
- Other name: Don Gardner
- Education: West Chester University (BM)
- Occupation: Songwriter
- Notable work: "All I Want for Christmas Is My Two Front Teeth"

Donald Yetter Gardner (August 20, 1913 – September 15, 2004) was an American songwriter who is best known for writing the classic Christmas novelty song "All I Want for Christmas Is My Two Front Teeth".

== Early life and education ==
Gardner was born in Portland, Pennsylvania. He earned a bachelor's degree in music from West Chester University.

== Career ==
Gardner wrote "All I Want for Christmas Is My Two Front Teeth" in 1944 while teaching music at public schools in Smithtown, New York. He asked the class what they wanted for Christmas and noticed that almost all of them had at least one front tooth missing and answered with a lisp. Gardner wrote the song in 30 minutes. In a 1995 interview, Gardner said, "I was amazed at the way that silly little song was picked up by the whole country." The song was published in 1948 after an employee of Witmark music company heard Gardner sing it at a music teachers' conference.

The song was introduced in 1948 by singing group The Satisfiers on Perry Como's radio show, and originally recorded for RCA Victor by Spike Jones and His City Slickers on December 6, 1947, with lead vocal by George Rock. The record reached the top of the pop charts in 1948, and again in 1949. The song was also recorded by numerous other singers and performers, including George Strait, The Platters, The Andrews Sisters, Nat King Cole, and the cast of Sesame Street.

Gardner later became a music consultant for a major music publisher in Boston, Ginn & Company, wrote songs for music textbooks, and composed numerous hymns. His published hymns include "Man Shall Not Live by Bread Alone but by Every Word of God" and "Oh, Give Thanks Unto the Lord."

== Personal life ==
Gardner died at age 91 from complications after falling at his home in Needham, Massachusetts, outside of Boston.
