= Mary Kaye =

American guitarist and performer

Mary Kaye (née Malia Ka'aihue; January 9, 1924 – February 17, 2007) was an American guitarist and performer. She was active from the 1940s through 1960s.

== Biography ==
Malia Ka'aihue was born on January 9, 1924, in Detroit, Michigan, to father Johnny Kaʻaihue. Since she was twelve years old, Mary Kaye performed alongside her brother - Norman Kaye - in her father's band - Johnny Ka’aihue’s Royal Hawaiians. Mary Kaye would create her own band - the Mary Kaye Trio. The Mary Kaye Trio consisted of Mary Kaye, Frank Ross, Norman Kaye, and, for a time, Jules Pursley. The trio's original name was Mary Ka’aihue Trio; however, Norman Kaye pushed for the name to be changed to Mary Kaye Trio since he thought audiences would think the trio only performed Hawaiian music. The Mary Kaye Trio is credited with founding the Las Vegas "lounge" phenomenon at the Last Frontier. The trio also performed at the Sahara and Tropicana hotels.

In 1966, the Trio broke up and Mary Kaye moved to Vancouver, British Columbia, with her son Jaye (Jay) Kaye where she performed in a jazz club.

In a 2003 interview for Vintage Guitar magazine, Mary Kaye claimed to be descended from Hawaiian Queen Liliuokalani, through her father Johnny Kaʻaihue (Johnny Ukulele) who she claimed was "pure Hawaiian" and stated, "he was the son of Prince Kuhio, Queen Liliuokalani's cousin." However, according to the genealogy Liliuokalani put in her biography, her brothers were King David Kalākaua and Prince William Pitt Leleiohoku II. Neither Liliuokalani nor her brothers had any biological children.

Mary Kaye died of pulmonary disease on February 17, 2007, at Las Vegas' Mountain View Hospital in Nevada.

=== Family ===
Mary Kaye married and later divorced Jules Pursley. Kaye had three children - Jeffrey Pursley, Donna Ramirez, and Jaye Kaye. Her son Jay Kaye, born in 1953 in St. Louis, Missouri, was also a musician. In 1968, at the age of 15, he put out his first LP, Suddenly One Summer. He later moved to Mallorca, Spain, where he was a prominent part of the local music scene through the 1990s and 2000s. Jay died in Spain in 2015. As of 2007, Mary Kaye had nine grandchildren.

== "Mary Kaye" American Stratocaster ==
Kaye was photographed with her bandmates Frank Ross and Norman Kaye (her brother, born Norman Ka'aihue) of the Mary Kaye Trio in a 1956 Fender promotional advertisement featuring a new Stratocaster electric guitar. This ash blonde guitar with maple neck and gold hardware later became popularly known as "The Mary Kaye Strat." Only a few were produced in 1956, but the color was reintroduced to the Fender line after strong international demand for the color scheme. A limited Custom Shop series "Mary Kaye Tribute Strat" was issued in 2005. In 2007, a "57 Reissue Mary Kaye Strat" was released for the 50th anniversary of the Stratocaster. The Custom Shop release was featured in the 2005 Fender "Frontline Catalog" along with her personal history in an interview with Fender.

In 2003, Kaye received the first official signature "Mary Kaye" American Stratocaster, gifted to her by the Fender Custom Shop. This instrument, serial MK 001, has a dedication to her on the instrument's back plate, reading "To Mary Kaye From Your Friends at Fender." The instrument was listed with online luxury retailer Luxify.com and their broker INTMIX—The International Musical Instrument Exchange, which produced an in-depth look at the instrument, narrated by Mary Kaye's nephew, John Kaye.

== See also ==
- Cha-Cha-Cha Boom!
