= Dragoon Wells Massacre =

1957 film by Harold D. Schuster

- Theatrical release poster
- Directed by: Harold D. Schuster
- Screenplay by: Warren Douglas
- Story by: Oliver Drake
- Produced by: Lindsley Parsons
- Starring: Barry Sullivan; Dennis O'Keefe; Mona Freeman; Katy Jurado; Sebastian Cabot; Jack Elam; Hank Worden
- Cinematography: William H. Clothier
- Edited by: Maurice Wright
- Music by: Paul Dunlap
- Production company: Lindsley Parsons Productions
- Distributed by: Allied Artists Pictures
- Release date: April 28, 1957 (United States)
- Running time: 88 minutes
- Country: United States
- Language: English

Dragoon Wells Massacre is a 1957 American CinemaScope DeLuxe Color Western film directed by Harold D. Schuster starring Barry Sullivan, Dennis O'Keefe, Mona Freeman and Katy Jurado. The supporting cast features Sebastian Cabot, Jack Elam and Hank Worden.

== Plot ==
Three wagons converge in the middle of nowhere. The first is carrying Jonah, an Indian trader and his wares. Jonah finds Army captain Matt Riordan, the only survivor of an ambush by Chief Yellow Claw and his Apache braves, in the middle of the desert.

The second wagon to arrive is a prison wagon carrying accused killer Link Ferris and a second man, known as Tioga, to town for trial, escorted by Marshal Bill Haney. This wagon is driven by Jud with Tom riding shotgun.

The last to arrive is the stagecoach, driven by Hopi Charlie, carrying Matt's former sweetheart Ann Bradley with her new beau, wealthy Philip Scott, as well as Mara Fay, an entertainer. The passengers are warned that Yellow Claw is in the area. Link and Tioga have their shackles removed so they can assist the others when the Apaches attack.

Jonah kills Jud and attempts to escape with the wagon, which has a false bottom containing guns he planned to sell to the Indians. Link manages to stop him and they place him in the Marshall's custody.

They make a stand against the Apaches. Tom is killed and Matt tells Yellow Claw he will get no more guns if Jonah dies. Yellow Claw withdraws.

They head for the relay station with the Apaches following. Hopi is killed by an arrow.

At the relay station the group finds the station masters wife barely alive, but very concerned about her daughter, Susan. Tioga finds Susan in the cellar of the destroyed station. Susan is with her mother as she dies and is then comforted by Ann.

Ann wakes realizing Susan is gone, kidnapped by an Apache. Tioga sacrifices his life to save the child and kill the Apache escaping with Susan.

They leave the relay station and the Apaches soon attack, causing one of the horses carrying the ammunition to go over the cliff. They continue on to the fort at Dragoon Wells. They arrive but the soldiers are dead and the well water has been salted. They decide to send one person on the one horse they have. The men cut cards to decide who'll go. Link "wins" and leaves on the last horse.

While they wait for help Matt grows closer to Mara. Ann tells Philip she doesn't know what she wants and he breaks off the relationship telling her that "the only thing she cares for is herself". Ann and Mara brawl, Link and the Marshall pull them apart.

The Apaches approach the fort with Link, who was captured. They want to trade Jonah for Link, this is agreed to by the travelers and Jonah leaves with the Apaches.

Ann tends to Link who was injured during his capture and the two begin to bond. Matt and Link join forces to defeat the raiders. Link sneaks up on Jonah, shoots him and steals a horse from the Apaches to lead them away from the fort. The others escape and set up an ambush as Link leads the Apaches into the trap. Yellow Claw is killed and the beaten Apaches retreat. The group takes the Apache horses and head to Fort Bennington.

For his help, Link is granted his freedom by Haney. As he rides away, Link is followed by Ann.

== Cast ==
- Barry Sullivan as Link Ferris
- Dennis O'Keefe as Capt. Matt Riordan
- Mona Freeman as Ann Bradley
- Katy Jurado as Mara Fay
- Sebastian Cabot as Jonah
- Casey Adams as Phillip Scott
- Jack Elam as Tioga
- Trevor Bardette as Marshal Bill Haney
- Jon Shepodd as Tom
- Hank Worden as Hopi Charlie
- Warren Douglas as Jud
- Judy Strangis as Susan
- Alma Beltran as Station agent's wife
- John War Eagle as Yellow Claw

== Production ==
Parts of the film were shot in Kanab Canyon, Johnson Canyon, the Gap, and the Kanab movie fort in Utah.

== Reception ==
Time Out called it "a highly enjoyable film, magnificently shot by William Clothier and with a surprisingly tight, inventive script by Warren Douglas ".

== Comic book adaptation ==
- Dell Four Color #815 (July 1957)

== See also ==
- First Battle of Dragoon Springs
- List of American films of 1957
