= Del Porter =

American jazz musician (1902–1977)

- Born: Delmar Smith Porter; April 13, 1902; Newberg, Oregon, United States
- Died: October 4, 1977 (aged 75) Los Angeles, California, United States
- Genres: Big band jazz
- Occupations: Band leader, jazz musician
- Instrument: Vocals
- Years active: 1924–1977

Del Porter (April 13, 1902, Newberg, Oregon – October 4, 1977, Los Angeles) was an American jazz vocalist, saxophonist, and clarinetist who, in the 1930s, performed on Broadway, toured with Glenn Miller, and recorded with Bing Crosby, Dick Powell, and Red Nichols, and in the 1940s, led his own big band.

Porter was a singer with the Foursome, which came to prominence in the 1930 Broadway hit show, Girl Crazy. Porter, the best known member of the quartet, co-founded City Slickers with Spike Jones, about the time his group The Feather Merchants split up. With the Foursome's arranger and Porter's lifelong friend, Raymond M. Johnson, Porter reorganized the quartet around 1946 as the Sweet Potato Tooters. "Sweet potato" is a nickname for an ocarina.

== On Broadway ==
The Foursome, with members Del Porter, Ray Johnson, J. Marshall Smith and Dwight Snyder, first appeared on Broadway in the two-act musical Ripples that ran for 55 performances. The show opened on February 11, 1930, at the New Amsterdam Theatre and ran through March 29. The members of The Foursome appeared as state troopers in the show, which had music by Oscar Levant and Albert Sirmay, a book by William Anthony McGuire, and lyrics by Irving Caesar and Graham John.

The Foursome next appeared in the George and Ira Gershwin show Girl Crazy, which ran for 272 performances. The Foursome were featured in the opening number "The Lonesome Cowboy Won't Be Lonesome Now!". They also performed the song Bidin' My Time, which was reprised twice in the opening act, and were part of the cast performing "I Got Rhythm", where they were featured with Ethel Merman.

The Foursome's final Broadway show was in Cole Porter's Anything Goes, at the Alvin Theatre in 1934. The Foursome was reunited with Ethel Merman. They had two featured musical numbers, "Sailors' Chantey (There'll Always Be a Lady Fair)", and sang the Anything Goes number with Ethel Merman.

== Foursome Recordings and On Film ==
Del Porter joined the Foursome in 1928. He was brought in by Ray Johnson, who he had met at Oregon State Agriculture College. They joined Marshall Smith and Dwight Snyder who had formed the Foursome in 1926. Prior to Porter joining the group they had recorded for Columbia Records. The Foursome's biggest hit was the song Walkin' My Baby Back Home in 1932. There was one thing that separated the Foursome from the many, many other vocal quartettes in the USA; the Foursome also played Ocarinas in harmony, which was not an easy thing to do. When they were in Hollywood shooting Born to Dance (1936) Porter ran into Bing Crosby. Bing had met him in Spokane in the Twenties where Porter and Ray Johnson were musicians playing a gig in a dance band. Crosby liked the Foursome's singing, but realized the ocarinas, and also Porter's clarinet, could add a fresh sound to old songs. He invited them to back him up on his radio show The Kraft Music Hall. Bing also brought them into the recording studio to record songs for Decca such as Sweet Georgia Brown; Ida, Sweet as Apple Cider; My Honey's Loving Arms; Chinatown, My Chinatown and others in 1937. In 1938 they backed up Dick Powell on several recordings, and they backed up Bing on When the Bloom is on the Sage. They were even busier in 1939 backing up Pinky Tomlin, Shirley Ross, Dick Powell and Bing. One of the songs with Bing was the Johnny Burke and James V Monaco song "Sweet Potato Piper," inspired by the Foursome, for the 1940 film The Road to Singapore.

== With Spike Jones ==
Spike Jones, who played drums on some recordings by The Foursome, suggested to Porter that he should start his own band. Porter created The Feather Merchants, a six-piece ensemble that did comedy material in the style of then-popular musical comedians Freddie Fisher's Snickelfritz Band. Spike initially managed Porter's band for ten dollars a week. After limited success, Spike suggested that he join the band, and Porter accepted. Eventually, the band evolved from the Feather Merchants to Spike Jones and His City Slickers.

Porter was happy with being a creative force but not being the leader of a band. With the Slickers he could write songs, sing and play on records, and let Spike book the gigs. Porter was the lead vocalist, and also played clarinet and arranged. Among the songs Porter wrote. "Siam" and "Pass the Biscuits Mirandy" became part of the band's book. His arrangements were early hits, "Hotcha Cornia" and "Der Fuehrer's Face," with Der Fuehrer being the band's first recording.

"Der Fuehrer's Face" reached number three on the pop charts. It gave the Slickers exposure that got them on three national radio shows. On the show Furlough Fun (NBC's West Coast Network) they performed songs and also musical ads for Gilmore Gas. The show was on Monday nights at 7:30 pm. Among the songs they performed were the Porter composition "The Greatest Man in Siam," and the Porter arrangement "Hotcha Cornia." Furlough Fun ran for two seasons. They also made over a dozen appearances on the radio show Command Performance broadcast on the Armed Forces Radio Network . They started on September 19, 1942; with their last appearance on Christmas Eve 1944. On Command Performance they appeared with Tommy Dorsey, Cary Grant, Lionel Hampton, Bob Hope, Lena Horne, Dinah Shore and Ethel Waters. In 1943 they started regular appearances on The Bob Burns Show. They continued with Bob Burns until The Slickers got their own radio show, sponsored by Chase and Sanborn Coffee in 1945.

Among the rarest of the Spike Jones recordings were Cinamatone discs. They were 12 inch records with ten tunes on one side, recorded the year before the Slickers received their RCA Victor contract, in 1940. They were for a jukebox that played one song for a penny. Porter sang on the Slickers sides; the band was called The Penny Funnies. Dr. Demento on a Spike Jones tribute night in 2015 played, with Porter singing, the Cinamatone, Runnin' Wild.

== Entertaining the Troops ==
In 1944 the Slickers and Porter performed for the troops in Europe. They flew to Scotland, then to London on a train. The train was unable to reach London because a buzz bomb had destroyed the tracks outside the city. A bus arrived eventually to take them into town. There they found more buzz bomb attacks. Porter said in an interview with Ted Haring in 1971: "But, oh, we had buzz bombs like mad! Boy! We had three or four a week while we were over there." After entertaining troops in England they went to France, just after D Day. On the tour with them was Dinah Shore and Edward G Robinson. Porter said, "And we gave a big show up on the hill from the beach that night. And you should have seen the guys! Well, you've seen the Bob Hope things on TV. Well, they were spread out acres of guys! It was the most thrilling thing in the world! And, oh, did they enjoy it! Dinah, she was terrific! In fact, when we first got on the beach, she stood up on the side of a truck and sang five or six (or maybe more) songs, with no accompaniment or anything, for the guys that gathered around. Other trucks were going by, and the dust was flying. How she sang in that dust, I'll never know! Great gal. Wonderful gal." From there the Slickers separated from Shore and Robinson, going out by themselves to entertain. Porter reported: "We were with the Ninth Air Corps all the time we were in France, playing one landing strip after another. We had our base camp at one, and we'd start out in the morning, real early. And at lunch time we'd play one, oh, probably 60 miles away. We'd have lunch there, and then we'd go on, play one mid-afternoon, and then some place else and play one in the evening. And then, coming back to our base camp after dark, with no lights but – you know what cat eyes are on a truck? They're just a little strip of light. That's all the light we had. And these green drivers, these guys that didn't know where they were (Laughs), it was real exciting! Believe me! And we had to have a password, every so often. Somebody would stop us, and you'd have to know the password. If the guy in the truck ever forgot the password, it was too bad!"

== Later years ==
Porter continued to compose music and perform. He also served as creative director and vice-president of Song Ad Film-Radio Productions.
