= Butch Cassidy (TV series) =

1973 animated television series

- Also known as: Butch Cassidy and the Sundance Kids
- Genre: Mystery
- Written by: William Raynor; Miles Wilder; Fred Fox; Seaman Jacobs; Bernie Kahn; Earl Klein; Norman Hudis; Ed Jurist; Sam Roeca; Dick Wesson
- Directed by: Charles A. Nichols
- Voices of: Lloyd "Chip" Hand II; Micky Dolenz; Kristina "Tina" Holland; Judy Strangis; John Stephenson; Frank Welker
- Theme music composer: Hoyt Curtin
- Country of origin: United States
- Original language: English
- No. of seasons: 1
- No. of episodes: 13

Production
- Executive producers: William Hanna; Joseph Barbera
- Camera setup: Ralph Migliori; Jerry Mills; Norman Stainback; Roy Wade
- Running time: 30 minutes
- Production company: Hanna-Barbera Productions

Original release
- Network: NBC
- Release: September 8 – December 1, 1973

Butch Cassidy also known as Butch Cassidy and the Sundance Kids is a 30-minute American Saturday morning animated series produced by Hanna-Barbera Productions and broadcast on NBC from September 8, 1973, to December 1, 1973. The series title is a play on the name of the unrelated 1969 film Butch Cassidy and the Sundance Kid. The characters' music group is called the Sun Dance Kids.

== Plot ==
Similar to Scooby-Doo, Where Are You! and Josie and the Pussycats on CBS and Jonny Quest on ABC, the show depicts the adventures of a group of teens and their preternaturally intelligent pet. The Sun Dance Kids consists of four heartthrobs: Butch Cassidy (lead vocals and lead guitar); mini-skirted blonde beauty Merilee (tambourine); sensible Stephanie, nicknamed Steffy (bass guitar); and curly-haired Wally (drums). Accompanied by Wally's dog Elvis, these popular rock stars lead double lives as government-backed crime-fighters.

The teens are advised by a supercomputer named Mr. Socrates, who is (somehow) violently allergic to dogs. When the group meets with Mr. Socrates in his lair for their latest assignment, Elvis is always told to stay outside. Yet Elvis always ends up inside the lair, by his own ingenuity and/or by Wally's forgetfulness. Elvis's mere presence causes Mr. Socrates to sneeze and go haywire; Mr. Socrates then sends the group out of the lair, and off to their assignment. Butch, designated as "Sundance 1", wears a special communicator-ring which keeps him in contact with Mr. Socrates.

== Cast ==
- Lloyd "Chip" Hand II as Butch Cassidy
- Micky Dolenz as Wally
- Kristina Holland as Stephanie
- John Stephenson as Mr. Socrates
- Judy Strangis as Merilee
- Frank Welker as Elvis, Wally's dog

== Episodes ==
No.	Title	Original release date
1	"The Scientist"	September 8, 1973
Butch and the kids must help smuggle a scientist out of a foreign country while dodging a colonel.
2	"The Counterfeiters"	September 15, 1973
A motorcycling baron in Latvania seems to be the source of counterfeit money, so the kids are sent to investigate.
3	"One of Our Ships Is Missing"	September 22, 1973
The kids are booked on a cruise ship that has been targeted by boat thieves and their captain.
4	"Double Trouble"	September 29, 1973
A young prince has been kidnapped and replaced by a lookalike. The Sun Dance Kids must expose the impostor and catch the kidnappers. Note: This episode mentions a number of real-life artists and songs, including "Woodstock" by Joni Mitchell and "Alice's Restaurant" by Arlo Guthrie.
5	"The Pearl Caper"	October 6, 1973
The kids go off to Honolulu to locate stolen pearls and the pearl thieves.
6	"The Gold Caper"	October 13, 1973
London calls as Butch and the kids try to find the mastermind behind a gold smuggling ring.
7	"Road Racers"	October 20, 1973
The Grand Prix Cross-European race in Venice is the setting for a diamond theft and Butch and the kids are sent to investigate.
8	"Hong Kong Story"	October 27, 1973
While entertaining their fan club in Hong Kong, the Sun Dance Kids must foil the robbery of a priceless jade statue.
9	"Operation G-Minus"	November 3, 1973
The kids must recover a stolen anti-gravity device from a toy expo in Munich.
10	"Orient Express"	November 10, 1973
The kids must deliver an important document to Paris on the Orient Express. To complicate things, Mr. Socrates has been taken over by an enemy agent.
11	"The Parrot Caper"	November 17, 1973
A parrot who knows an important formula must be delivered to Switzerland.
12	"The Super Sub"	November 24, 1973
The kids must recover a hijacked experimental super submarine from the Caribbean.
13	"The Haunted Castle"	December 1, 1973
The kids travel to the British Isles when Wally inherits a castle from a distant relative. However, Wally's castle seems to be haunted.

== Other appearances ==
- Butch Cassidy was also the subject of Issue #11 of Gold Key Comics' Hanna-Barbera Fun-In in 1974; the story, "The Pearl Caper," was adapted from the October 6, 1973 Butch Cassidy TV episode of the same name.
- Characters from Butch Cassidy appeared several times on the Adult Swim animated television series Sealab 2021. The whole band appeared in the episode "All That Jazz" in a long shot at a concert, standing in for MC Chris as Butch Cassidy and the Sun Dance Kids and performing the song "Fett's Vette". In a later episode, "Let 'Em Eat Corn!", the band appears again as inhabitants of SeaLab Pod Six, with Butch and Wally sporting mustaches. Then again, in the episode "Butchslap", the characters appeared alongside Marco, who was revealed to be one of the Sun Dance Kids. The character models for Butch and Wally were also used for the animated likeness of John Miller (the series director) and Adam Reed (one of the series writers) in the episodes, "Swimming in Oblivion" and "Return to Oblivion".
- Four songs from the show were released as singles on Romar Records. A full LP was mentioned on the labels as forthcoming, but was never released.

== Home media ==
On January 15, 2013, Warner Archive released Butch Cassidy and the Sundance Kids: The Complete Series on DVD in region 1 as part of their Hanna–Barbera Classics Collection. This is a Manufacture-on-Demand (MOD) release, available exclusively through Warner's online store and Amazon.com.

The series is also available at the iTunes Store.
