= Stoogemania =

1986 film by Chuck Workman

- Theatrical release poster
- Directed by: Chuck Workman
- Written by: Jim Geoghan; Chuck Workman
- Produced by: Michael Rosenblatt; James Ruxin; Chuck Workman
- Starring: Josh Mostel; Melanie Chartoff; Sid Caesar; Paul Garner; Mark Holton
- Cinematography: Christopher Tufty
- Edited by: James Ruxin
- Music by: Hummie Mann
- Distributed by: Atlantic Releasing Corporation
- Release date: 1986
- Running time: 83 minutes
- Country: United States
- Language: English

Stoogemania is a 1986 comedy film, directed by Chuck Workman and starring Josh Mostel as a huge fan of The Three Stooges for whom the line between reality and fiction begins to blur. Stoogemania was made in an attempt to cash in on the Three Stooges' resurgence in popularity during the 1980s, thanks to syndication and the hit novelty song "The Curly Shuffle" by Jump 'n the Saddle Band. The film experienced a brief theatrical release and was poorly received by critics.

In the United Kingdom, the film was released under the title Party Stooge.

== Plot ==
The film centers on Howard F. Howard (Josh Mostel), a huge fan of the Three Stooges. He is engaged to the woman he loves (Melanie Chartoff), and life seems to be going well. More recently, however, he has been starting to see the Stooges wherever he goes. To save his life and his relationship, he seeks the help of a renowned Stooge psychologist (Sid Caesar). However, his illness is part of a very serious epidemic which has apparently swept the nation. The doctor gives him the wrong medicine: a sleeping pill.

To his dismay, Howard continues to see the Stooges everywhere. He ends up going to "Stooge Row", a seedy part of Los Angeles located between the fictional "Shet Up Street" and "Nyuk Nyuk Boulevard". To combat this, a sanitarium known as Stooge Hills is created. While in an all-Stooge burlesque house, members of Stooge Hills (including James Avery) commit everyone in there to the sanitarium. Over a rigorous program, everyone is deemed cured. During the graduation ceremony, to prove that the Three Stooges are no longer funny, they play a few shorts. However, everyone comes to terms and realize "we love these guys". Howard marries his sweetheart, and the film ends on a happy note.

== Production ==
The film was not endorsed by Columbia Pictures or the Three Stooges trademark holders. Only four shorts are shown through the film, all of which are in the public domain: Sing a Song of Six Pants (1947), Malice in the Palace (1949), Brideless Groom (1947) and Disorder in the Court (1936). The film utilizes footage from these four public domain Columbia shorts, taken from 16mm dupes, and much of it was poorly colorized. This was reportedly the first time any Stooge films appeared colorized.

Victoria Jackson played a nurse at the fictional Stooge Hills while James Avery plays a orderly in the institute. Additionally, the local arcade owner is played by Paul "Mousie" Garner, who was one of Ted Healy's stooges and a member of the "New Three Stooges" in the 1970s.

== Home media ==
The film was released on VHS and Beta in 1986.
