= The Spike Jones Show =

American comedy and variety television series

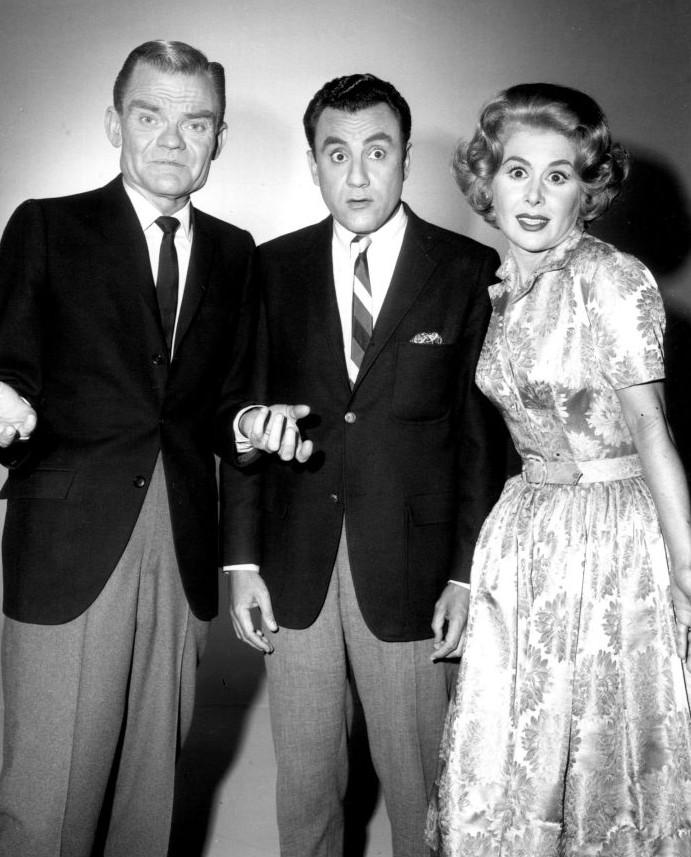
- From left: Spike Jones, Bill Dana, Helen Grayco, 1960
- Created by: Spike Jones
- Starring: Spike Jones; Helen Grayco; Billy Barty (1954–57); Bill Dana (1960–61); Lennie Weinrib (1960–61)
- Country of origin: United States

Production
- Running time: 60 minutes

Original release
- Network: NBC (1954); CBS (1957-61)
- Release: January 2, 1954 – September 25, 1961

Related
- Club Oasis; Swinging Spiketaculars

The Spike Jones Show is the name of several separate American comedy and variety series that aired on NBC and CBS in the 1950s and 1960s. The series was presented by actor and musician Spike Jones, his wife, musician Helen Grayco and their band, The City Slickers. The series also featured Billy Barty, Freddy Morgan, Paul Garner, Freddy Morgan, Bill Dana, and Lennie Weinrib.

== Show origins ==
After a short stint on the radio, in the late 1940s, Spike Jones began to see that there might be potential in the fairly new medium of television. With this potential in mind, Jones along with Edward F. Cline filmed two half-hour pilots in the summer of 1950; Foreign Legion and Wild Bill Hiccup. Neither were broadcast. Jones then decided to try live television bringing his wife Helen Grayco and his band, The City Slickers with him. For them, live television proved to be a success. The basis for The Spike Jones Show came about after an episode of The Colgate Comedy Hour on NBC. The episode, entitled "The Spike Jones Show", was originally broadcast on February 11, 1951. Three years after that telecast, NBC offered Jones, Grayco and his band their own slot on television.

== Original version (Jan.–May 1954) ==
The first version of The Spike Jones Show premiered on January 2, 1954 on NBC. The series was the first weekly television series that was presented by Spike Jones. The series also starred Helen Grayco and members of the City Slickers. It ran on Saturday evenings alongside The Jackie Gleason Show on CBS.

== Second version (Apr.–Aug. 1957) ==
Nearly three years after The Spike Jones Show finished its run on NBC, CBS decided to offer Jones and his band their own time slot on Tuesday nights. The CBS reincarnation of The Spike Jones Show premiered on April 2, 1957. However, the series was meant for replacement purposes only and its last episode aired on August 27, 1957. Guests included Gordon MacRae.

== Club Oasis with Spike Jones (Summer 1958) ==
On NBC, Club Oasis, which had a different host for each episode, became Club Oasis with Spike Jones during the summer of 1958 when Spike Jones became the permanent host.

== Final version (Jul.–Sept. 1961) ==
The final version of The Spike Jones Show premiered on July 31, 1961 on CBS. The series aired on Monday nights as a summer replacement only. Its last episode aired on September 25, 1961. This was the last incarnation of the series.

== Home media ==
A DVD entitled The Best of Spike Jones features scenes of the 1954 version of The Spike Jones Show. The DVD was released on November 24, 2009.
