= Goldie Gold and Action Jack =

- Developed by: Steve Gerber
- Written by: Mark Evanier
- Directed by: Rudy Larriva; John Kimball
- Voices of: Judy Strangis; Sonny Melendrez
- Music by: Dean Elliott
- Country of origin: United States
- Original language: English
- No. of episodes: 13

Production
- Executive producers: Joe Ruby; Ken Spears
- Running time: 30 minutes
- Production company: Ruby-Spears Enterprises

Original release
- Network: ABC
- Release: September 12 – December 5, 1981

Goldie Gold and Action Jack is a 30-minute Saturday morning animated series produced by Ruby-Spears Enterprises that aired for one season on ABC from September 12 to December 5, 1981. 13 episodes were produced.

The show was rerun on Cartoon Network in 1994, and Boomerang in 2000.

== Plot ==
The series follows the random adventures of Goldie Gold, a blond, beautiful heiress whose late parents left her a newspaper called The Gold Street Journal and her boyfriend, ace reporter "Action Jack" Travis, who works very closely with Goldie and her Cocker Spaniel Nugget. Also frequently seen is Jack's boss, GSJ editor Sam Gritt.

== Episodes ==
No.	Title	Written by	Original release date
1	"Night of the Crystal Skull"	Steve Gerber	September 12, 1981
2	"Pirate of the Airways"	Mark Evanier	September 19, 1981
3	"Red Dust of Doom"	Cliff Ruby; Elana Lesser	September 26, 1981
4	"Revenge of the Ancient Astronaut"	Gary Greenfield	October 3, 1981
5	"Prophet of Doom"	Christopher Vane	October 10, 1981
6	"Night of the Walking Doom"	Jeffrey Scott; Martin Pasko	October 17, 1981
The Oracle makes a series of predictions, all of which come true. Could he be the one making them possible?
7	"Island of Terror"	Cliff Ruby; Elana Lesser	October 24, 1981
A gloved hand that formerly belonged to Jacob Reese that can move by itself targets three wealthy entrepreneurs that were said to have cheated Jacob out of a fortune.
8	"Curse of the Snake People"	Martin Pasko	October 31, 1981
9	"Race Against Time"	Cliff Ruby; Elana Lesser	November 7, 1981
The Steel Claw goes into the past to turn the ancestors of the Stern family into lizard-like mutants. He takes Goldie, Jack, and Nugget along for the ride, and they get help from Goldie's ancestor, Lotta Gold.
10	"Menace of the Medallion"	Cliff Ruby; Elana Lesser	November 14, 1981
Jack and Goldie investigate a series of bizarre crimes, all of which involve a strange medallion.
11	"Pursuit Into Peril"	Buzz Dixon	November 21, 1981
A gang of criminals are after Mogani's Magic Box. Note: This episode's plot is very similar to Raiders of the Lost Ark, which was released a few months before this episode aired.
12	"The Return of the Man Beast"	Mark Evanier	November 28, 1981
13	"The Goddess of the Black Pearl"	Cliff Ruby; Elana Lesser	December 5, 1981
An undead king returns from the grave and uses a herb to brainwash Goldie into becoming his wife, the Goddess of the Black Pearl.

== Voice cast ==
- Judy Strangis as Goldie Gold
- Sonny Melendrez as Jack Travis
- Booker Bradshaw as Sam Gritt
- Peter Cullen
- Alan Dinehart
- Walker Edmiston
- Keye Luke
- Terry McGovern
- Shepard Menken
- Avery Schreiber
- Lyle Talbot

== Crew ==
- Alan Dinehart - Voice Director

== Production ==
Following his work on Thundarr the Barbarian for Ruby-Spears, Jack Kirby provided the designs for Goldie Gold and Action Jack based on a concept conceived by Steve Gerber, also of Thundarr. Additional work developing the series was done by Mark Evanier and Martin Pasko.

== Broadcast ==
The series was broadcast on ABC from September 12, 1981 through September 18, 1982 . The series was rebroadcast on Cartoon Network beginning January 8, 1994.

== Home media ==
- A VHS tape, Goldie Gold and Action Jack, was released by Worldvision Enterprises in 1985 and contained the episodes "Night of the Crystal" and "Red Dust of Doom".
- A second VHS tape, Goldie Gold and Action Jack: Solid Gold Adventures, was released by Worldvision Enterprises in 1986 and contained the episodes "Island of Terror" and "Revenge of the Ancient Astronaut".
- The episode "Night of the Crystal Skull" was released on DVD in 2010 as part of the collection Saturday Morning Cartoons- 1980s, Volume 1.
