= Anne Stedman =

American actress

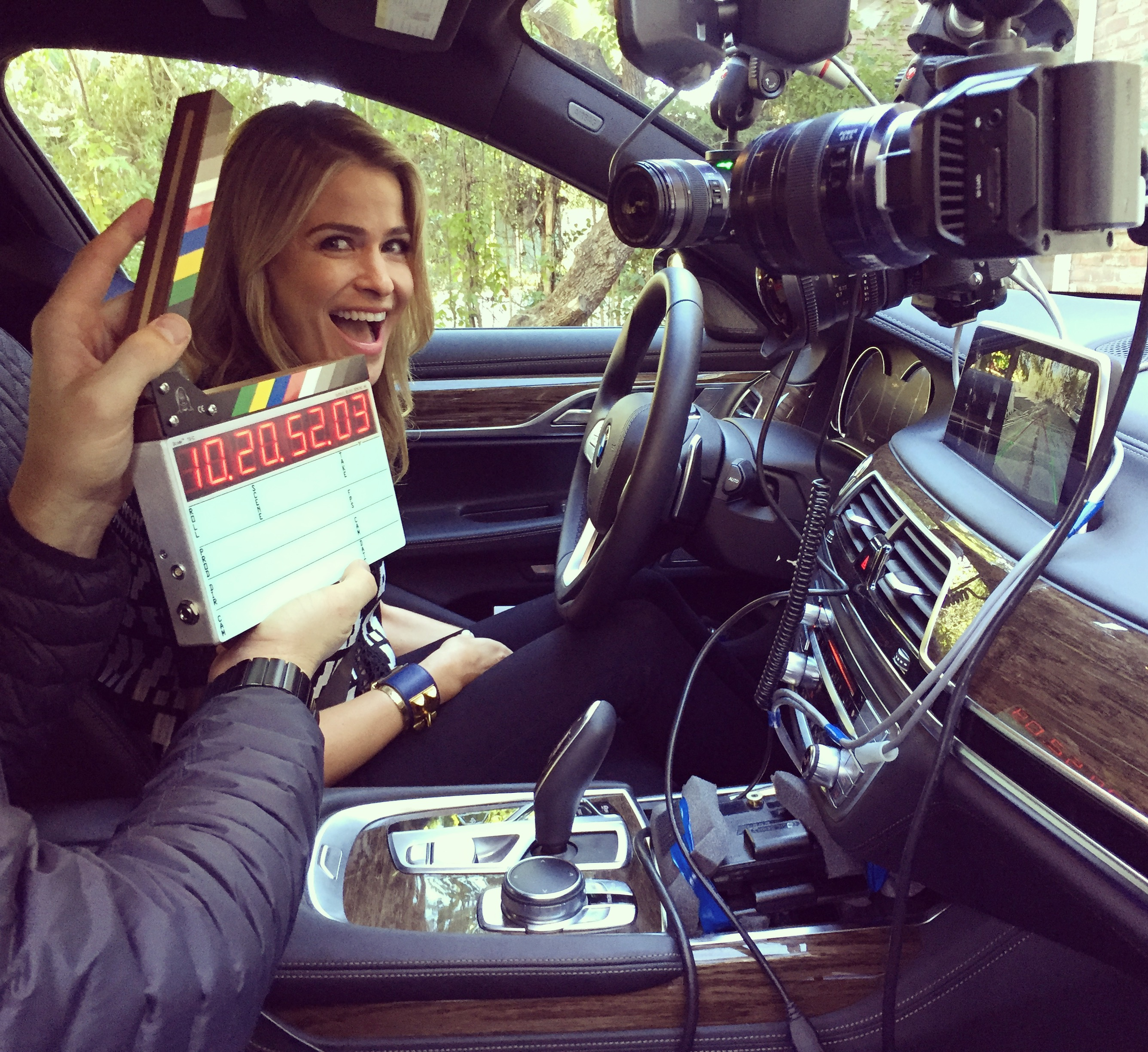
- Stedman on set in 2016
- Born: San Antonio, Texas, U.S.
- Occupations: Actress, blogger
- Years active: 1997–present

Anne Stedman is an American actress. Her roles include Dyna Girl in Electra Woman and Dyna Girl and Melanie on The Mullets.

== Career ==
=== Acting ===
Stedman was born in San Antonio, Texas. She started her career while studying at University of Texas at Austin when Richard Linklater cast her for the role of Madeline in his film The Newton Boys. She then moved to Los Angeles to begin her acting career. Stedman appeared in movies including Space Cowboys and Dr. Dolittle 2. On television, she appeared on That 70's Show, Electra Woman and Dyna Girl, The Mullets, Mal de Ojo, Life in Pieces and Loot. She also created a TV series called Drunk Mom Reviews.

=== Influencer ===
In May 2012, Stedman created Chic Mama LA all about fashion, beauty and tips about being a mother. In 2017 a web series Chic Mama Carpool was then created; guests have included Jordana Brewster, Molly Sims and Marla Sokoloff. In 2018 Stedman started the scripted series Chic Mama Drama. Then in 2023 Stedman she launched her clothing website Anne Stedman Style

=== Author ===
In 2016, Stedman and her family wrote the book Mary's Story: A Family's Journey With Cancer about her sister Mary who died of cancer.

=== Film and television ===
| Year | Title | Role | Notes |
|---|---|---|---|
| 1998 | The Newton Boys | Madeline | |
| 1999 | Bingo | Julie | |
| 2000 | Space Cowboys | Jason's Girlfriend | |
| 2001 | Tempting David | Ann | |
| 2001 | Dr. Dolittle 2 | Woman | |
| 2001 | That 70's Show | Jill | |
| 2001 | Electra Woman and Dyna Girl | Dyna Girl | |
| 2002 | Providence | Rachel | |
| 2003 | The Mullets | Melanie | |
| 2004 | 50 First Dates | Ex-Girlfriend | |
| 2004 | The Practice | Caryn Davis | |
| 2014 | The Blackout | Dispatcher Melinda | |
| 2015 | Mal de Ojo | Mrs. Rogers | |
| 2015 | Christmas Trade | Harper Shaw | |
| 2017 | Off The Walls | Principal Meyer | |
| 2017 | Life in Pieces | Sangria | |
| 2018 | Chic Mama Drama | Anne Stedman | |
| 2019 | Chic Mama Carpool | Anne Stedman | |
| 2019 | Modern Family | Allison | |
| 2021 | Computer Love | Kathlinda | |
| 2021 | Drunk Mom Reviews | Drunk Mom | |
| 2022 | Loot (TV series) | Commentator | |
| 2023 | Hall Pass Nightmare | Sarah Clerk | |
