= All I Want for Christmas Is My Two Front Teeth =

"All I Want for Christmas (Is My Two Front Teeth)"

Single by Spike Jones and his City Slickers
- B-side: "Happy New Year"
- Released: 1948
- Recorded: December 6, 1947
- Genre: Novelty, Christmas
- Label: RCA Victor
- Songwriter: Donald Yetter Gardner

"All I Want for Christmas Is My Two Front Teeth" is a novelty Christmas song written in 1944 by Donald Yetter Gardner while teaching music at public schools in Smithtown, New York. He asked his second grade class what they wanted for Christmas, and noticed that almost all of the students had at least one front tooth missing as they answered in a lisp. Gardner wrote the song in 30 minutes. In a 1995 interview, Gardner said, "I was amazed at the way that silly little song was picked up by the whole country." The song was published in 1948 after an employee of Witmark music company heard Gardner sing it at a music teachers' conference.

The song was introduced in 1948 by singing group The Satisfiers on Perry Como's radio show, and originally recorded for RCA Victor by Spike Jones and His City Slickers on December 6, 1947, with lead vocal by George Rock. The record reached the top of the pop charts in 1948, and again in 1949. The song has also been recorded by numerous other singers and performers, including Ray Stevens, George Strait, Danny Kaye with The Andrews Sisters, Urbie Green, The Platters, Dread Zeppelin, The Kelly Family, Nat King Cole (reportedly Gardner's favorite version), The Chipmunks, the Hampton String Quartet, The Three Stooges, Comedian Dick Emery and Count von Count of Sesame Street.

In the versions by Spike, The Chipmunks (Theodore on lead vocals), and Ray Stevens, the song ends with the performer yelling out, "Oh, for goodness' sakes; Happy New Year!!!!"

Homer and Jethro parodied the song as "All I Want for Christmas Is My Upper Plate", on their 1968 album Cool Crazy Christmas.

Drag performer and singer RuPaul parodied the song on his Christmas album Ho Ho Ho. In his version, the singer lists "a litany of plastic surgery requests" that he would like to receive for the holiday.

In 1986, the song title was parodied in "All I Want for Christmas Is a Dukla Prague Away Kit" by the band Half Man Half Biscuit on The Trumpton Riots EP.

Country music parodist Cledus T. Judd parodied the song on his 2002 Christmas album Cledus Navidad. Titled "All I Want for Christmas Is Two Gold Front Teef", Judd's parody is performed in rap.

The Spike Jones version of "All I Want for Christmas Is My Two Front Teeth" was inducted into the Grammy Hall of Fame in 2007.

== See also ==
- List of number-one singles of 1949 (U.S.)
