= Cha-Cha-Cha Boom! =

1956 film by Fred F. Sears

- Lobby card
- Directed by: Fred F. Sears
- Written by: Robert E. Kent
- Produced by: Sam Katzman
- Starring: Damaso Perez Prado; Helen Grayco; Stephen Dunne
- Cinematography: Benjamin Kline
- Edited by: Jerome Thoms
- Music by: Mischa Bakaleinikoff
- Production company: Clover Productions
- Distributed by: Columbia Pictures
- Release date: October 2, 1956
- Running time: 78 minutes
- Country: United States
- Language: English

Cha-Cha-Cha Boom! is a 1956 American musical film starring Dámaso Pérez Prado, Stephen Dunne, the Mary Kaye Trio, Helen Grayco, Luis Arcaraz and his Orchestra, Lucerto Bárcenas, and Manny López and his Orchestra. It was produced by Sam Katzman for Columbia Pictures and directed by Fred F. Sears and was their immediate follow-up to Rock Around the Clock (actress Alix Talton appeared in both films). Filming started 14 May 1956.

It was also known as Cha Cha Cha.

== Plot ==
An American record executive travels to Cuba to find some talent for his record label.

== Cast ==
- Stephen Dunne as Bill Haven
- Damaso Perez Prado as Himself
- Helen Grayco as Herself
- Mary Kaye as Herself
- Alix Talton as Debbie Farmer
- Jose Gonzales-Gonzales as Pedro Fernandez
- Sylvia Lewis as Nita Munay
- Bernie Lowe as Himself
- Dante DiPaolo as Elvarez
- Ruben Rodriguez as Timbale Player

== Soundtrack ==
- Year 'Round Love
  - Written by Rose Marie McCoy, and Charles Singleton
- Crazy Crazy
  - Music by Dámaso Pérez Prado
- Mambo No. 8
  - Music by Dámaso Pérez Prado
- Que Rico El Mambo
  - Music by Dámaso Pérez Prado
- Voodoo Suite
  - Music by Dámaso Pérez Prado
- La niña Popoff
  - Written by Dámaso Pérez Prado, Albrecht Marcuse and Aguste G. Schmutz
- Cuban Rock and Roll
  - Music by Dámaso Pérez Prado
- El Marinero
  - Written by Ricardo Rico
- The Lonesome Road
  - Music by Nathaniel Shilkret
  - Lyrics by Gene Austin
  - Performed by the Mary Kaye Trio
- Get Happy
  - Music by Harold Arlen
  - Lyrics by Ted Koehler
  - Performed by the Mary Kaye Trio
- Lilly's Lament
  - Written by Frances Maurine Barris, Robert Wells, Jack Allison and Loyce Whiteman
  - Performed by Helen Grayco
- Save Your Sorrow
  - Lyrics by Buddy G. DeSylva
  - Music by Al Sherman
- Despacho
- Diosa
  - Written by Manny Lopez and Jorge Hernández
- Mi musica es para ti
  - Written by René Touzet
- Gelatina
  - Written by Carlos Molina and Alvaro Escobar
- Lucero
  - Written by Carlos Molina and Alvaro Escobar
- Theme from Picnic
  - Music by George Duning
