= Electra Woman and Dyna Girl =

Segment on the Krofft Supershow

- Title card
- Created by: Joe Ruby; Ken Spears
- Developed by: Dick Robbins; Duane Poole
- Starring: Deidre Hall; Judy Strangis; Norman Alden
- Country of origin: United States
- No. of episodes: 16

Production
- Producers: Sid and Marty Krofft; Walter Miller
- Running time: 12 minutes (per episode)
- Production companies: Sid and Marty Krofft Television Productions; Krofft Entertainment

Original release
- Network: ABC
- Release: September 11 – December 25, 1976

Electra Woman and Dyna Girl (stylized as ElectraWoman and DynaGirl) is a live action superhero children's television series from 1976 created by Sid and Marty Krofft. The series aired 16 episodes in a single season as part of the umbrella series The Krofft Supershow. During the second season, it was dropped, along with Dr. Shrinker. When later syndicated in the package "Krofft Super Stars" and released on home video, the 16 segments, which were each about 12 minutes long, were combined into eight episodes.

== Premise ==
The program followed the crime-fighting exploits of caped superhero Electra Woman (played by Deidre Hall) and her teen sidekick Dyna Girl (Judy Strangis), who worked in their normal lives as reporters for Newsmaker Magazine (the two's surnames were never revealed—just their first names: Lori and Judy, respectively). In each episode, the duo dons brightly-colored spandex costumes, in a bright flash of light called an "Electra-Change"; get into the "ElectraCar"; and use an array of technically-advanced gadgets to thwart an eclectic collection of supervillains. They were assisted by Frank Heflin (Norman Alden), a scientist who stayed at their "ElectraBase", operating its highly sophisticated "CrimeScope" computer while keeping in continual contact with the pair through their "ElectraComs".

== Characters ==
=== Main ===
- Lori / Electra Woman was played by Deidre Hall
- Judy / Dyna Girl was played by Judy Strangis
- Professor Frank Heflin was portrayed by Norman Alden
- Marvin Miller as Narrator

=== The "ElectraEnemies" with their henchpersons ===
- The Sorcerer (Michael Constantine) and Miss Dazzle (Susan Lanier)
- The Empress of Evil (Claudette Nevins) and Lucretia (Jacquelyn Hyde)
- Ali Baba (Malachi Throne) and the Genie (Sid Haig)
- Glitter Rock (John Mark Robinson) and Side Man (Jeff David)
- The Spider-Lady (Tiffany Bolling) with Leggs (Robert Sutton) and Spinner (Bruce Fischer)
- The Pharaoh (Peter Mark Richman) and Cleopatra (Jane Elliot)

== The ElectraComs ==
The ElectraComs were bulky wrist devices worn by the title characters. They could function as two-way radios with video capabilities; they also served a variety of other specialized functions, which allowed the duo to escape various traps devised by their enemies. With the addition of special cartridge attachments, the ElectraComs were additionally seen to perform the following functions on the show:

- Direct-A-Scan – navigates the title characters through buildings to the exact location of the villain.
- Electra-Change – allows the title characters to change from their civilian clothing to the costumes of their super-powered alter-egos instantaneously.
- Electra-Beam – emits a focused kinetic beam of energy that can "push" or "pull" objects much like a tractor or pressor beam.
- Electra-Degravitate – allows the title characters to defy gravity for very short distances so that they can circumvent obstacles in their path or levitate themselves to higher ground.
- Electra-Force – apparently breaks steel bars (was not available the one time it was attempted).
- Electra-Force Shield – is essentially a force field used to detain villains once they have been caught. The shield was also used defensively as a protective barrier that can shield against physical and energy attacks.
- Electra-Freeze – lowers the temperature of the target to below freezing.
- Electra-G – increases the weight of the target.
- Electra-Split – replicates target to create a copy. Both objects are left in an unstable state and it does not work on human beings.
- Electra-Strobe – speeds the wearer's motions, thoughts, and actions 10,000 times faster than normal.
- Electra-Vibe – creates a localized sonic field that can shatter glass or disorient an opponent who is not equipped with earplugs.
- Electra-Vision – emits a blindingly bright light, turning night into day.
- Electra-X – is a portable X-ray that reveals the target's skeleton or identity beneath any disguise.

== Other resources ==
- The ElectraCar is a shield-shaped, three-wheeled vehicle that can also convert into the "ElectraPlane" with its wheels folded under/inside it. As the ElectraPlane, the ElectraCar is capable of flying into low Earth orbit. It also has a tracking beam for pursuing villains.
- The ElectraBase, located beneath the duo's civilian home and accessible by a hidden elevator, not only houses Frank Heflin's lab and the ElectraCar, but also serves as the home to "CrimeScope", one of the most powerful computers ever built – much like the Batcomputer, which it parodies. CrimeScope is always kept up-to-date with what is going on in the world, can analyze any data transmitted through the ElectraComs, and can also operate the ElectraCar via remote control.

== Episodes ==
No.	Title	Directed by	Written by	Original release date	Special Guest Villains
1	"The Sorcerer's Golden Trick"	Walter Miller	Dick Robbins and Duane Poole	September 11, 1976	The Sorcerer (Michael Constantine) and Miss Dazzle (Susan Lanier)
2	"The Sorcerer's Golden Trick"	Walter Miller	Dick Robbins and Duane Poole	September 18, 1976	The Sorcerer (Michael Constantine) and Miss Dazzle (Susan Lanier)
The Sorcerer escapes from prison and plans to rob Fort Knox with a powerful mirror. Electra Woman and Dyna Girl are trapped as the Sorcerer unleashes his mirror trick. Guest star: James Mock
3	"Glitter Rock"	Chuck Liotta	Dick Robbins and Duane Poole	September 25, 1976	Glitter Rock (John Mark Robinson) and Side Man (Jeff David)
4	"Glitter Rock"	Chuck Liotta	Dick Robbins and Duane Poole	October 2, 1976	Glitter Rock (John Mark Robinson) and Side Man (Jeff David)
The evil Glitter Rock and his assistant Side Man kidnap Electra Woman's friend in a plot to hypnotize the world. Electra Woman and Dyna Girl race to stop Glitter Rock from activating his hypno-music satellite. Guest star: Michael Blodgett
5	"Empress of Evil"	Walter Miller	Dick Robbins and Duane Poole	October 9, 1976	The Empress of Evil (Claudette Nevins) and Lucretia (Jacquelyn Hyde)
6	"Empress of Evil"	Walter Miller	Dick Robbins and Duane Poole	October 16, 1976	The Empress of Evil (Claudette Nevins) and Lucretia (Jacquelyn Hyde)
The Empress of Evil attacks ElectraBase and kidnaps Dyna Girl. Electra Woman faces off with the Empress of Evil, who is immune to her Electra-powers. Guest star: Jean Sarah Frost
7	"Ali Baba"	Walter Miller	Dick Robbins and Duane Poole	October 23, 1976	Ali Baba (Malachi Throne) and the Genie (Sid Haig)
8	"Ali Baba"	Walter Miller	Dick Robbins and Duane Poole	October 30, 1976	Ali Baba (Malachi Throne) and the Genie (Sid Haig)
Ali Baba wants the Metamorphosis Formula to turn everyone evil. Electra Woman confronts Ali Baba - and an evil Dyna Girl. Guest star: Ian Martin
9	"Return of the Sorcerer"	Walter Miller	Dick Robbins and Duane Poole	November 6, 1976	The Sorcerer (Michael Constantine) and Miss Dazzle (Susan Lanier)
10	"Return of the Sorcerer"	Walter Miller	Dick Robbins and Duane Poole	November 13, 1976	The Sorcerer (Michael Constantine) and Miss Dazzle (Susan Lanier)
The Sorcerer steals Merlin's Mirror and embarks on a crime wave. Electra Woman and Dyna Girl are trapped in another dimension beyond Merlin's Mirror. Guest star: Billy Beck
11	"The Pharaoh"	Jack Regas	Greg Strangis	November 20, 1976	The Pharaoh (Peter Mark Richman) and Cleopatra (Jane Elliot)
12	"The Pharaoh"	Jack Regas	Greg Strangis	November 27, 1976	The Pharaoh (Peter Mark Richman) and Cleopatra (Jane Elliot)
The Pharaoh plans to use a magical pyramid to release an energy being called Solaris, which takes over the city as Electra Woman and Dyna Girl speed to the Pharaoh's hideout. Guest stars: Bruce Hoy, H.B. Haggerty
13	"The Spider Lady"	Walter Miller	Gerry Day and Bethel Leslie	December 4, 1976	The Spider Lady (Tiffany Bolling), Spinner (Bruce Fischer), and Leggs (Robert Raymond Sutton)
14	"The Spider Lady"	Walter Miller	Gerry Day and Bethel Leslie	December 11, 1976	The Spider Lady (Tiffany Bolling), Spinner (Bruce Fischer), and Leggs (Robert Raymond Sutton)
The Spider Lady disguises herself as Electra Woman to frame her in a heist. Guest stars: Andrea Lovell, Andy Veneto
15	"Return of the Pharaoh"	Jack Regas	Greg Strangis	December 18, 1976	The Pharaoh (Peter Mark Richman) and Cleopatra (Jane Elliot)
16	"Return of the Pharaoh"	Jack Regas	Greg Strangis	December 25, 1976	The Pharaoh (Peter Mark Richman) and Cleopatra (Jane Elliot)
The Pharaoh intends to steal the mystical Coptic Eye. Guest star: Sterling Swanson

== Other adaptations ==
=== Unaired WB television pilot ===
The WB Television Network commissioned a pilot for a new version of the show in 2001 starring Markie Post as Electra Woman and Anne Stedman as Dyna Girl. The new series was written in the form of a cynical parody of the original show – and the superhero genre in general. It was set 25 years after the original series, with a retired Electra Woman brought back into action by a fan who ends up becoming the new Dyna Girl.

The pilot portrayed Electra Woman as a disillusioned, bitter, sexually promiscuous, chain smoking alcoholic, much in contrast to the character's original portrayal. In the pilot, Electra Woman had been married and divorced since the end of the original series, her husband having left her for the original Dyna Girl, taking her bank account and car and leaving her as trailer trash. Although the pilot was shot, the series was not picked up.

The pilot omits the character of Frank Heflin, but includes an in-joke reference to Norman Alden, who had portrayed him in the original. The university's alumni function is attended by Aquaman, whose character voice Alden had provided on the Super Friends animated series.

=== Web series ===
YouTube personalities Grace Helbig and Hannah Hart starred in a reboot of the original series. The show, produced by Tim Carter and Tomas Harlan through their Contradiction shingle, was directed by Chris Marrs Piliero and shot in Vancouver, B.C. during February and March 2015.

Electra Woman and Dyna Girl was digitally released by Fullscreen through its streaming platform as a series of eight 11-minute webisodes in April 2016. It was released on all major platforms on June 7, by Legendary Digital Studios and Sony Pictures Home Entertainment. A DVD version was released in late July through Sony Pictures Home Entertainment.

=== Parody ===
In 1992, comic-book writer Bryan J. L. Glass and artist Michael Avon Oeming created Lycra Woman and Spandex Girl, an "Aerobic Duo" of super-heroines parodying Electra Woman and Dyna Girl. After the DuPont chemical company successfully sued the creators for unauthorized use of its Lycra trademark, copies of all issues using the name were destroyed and the lead character's name was changed to Flex Woman. The pair appeared in several limited series and one-shot specials, most recently in 1997.
