= The Mullets =

American television sitcom

- Promotional poster
- Genre: Sitcom
- Created by: Bill Oakley; Josh Weinstein
- Starring: Loni Anderson; David Hornsby; John O'Hurley; Anne Stedman; Ben Tolpin; Michael Weaver
- Composer: Eric Speier
- Country of origin: United States
- Original language: English
- No. of seasons: 1
- No. of episodes: 11 (3 unaired)

Production
- Executive producers: Bill Oakley; Eric Tannenbaum; Kim Tannenbaum; Josh Weinstein
- Producer: Thomas Lofaro
- Production locations: Columbia/Warner Bros. Ranch; 411 North Hollywood Way, Burbank, California
- Cinematography: Rick F. Gunter; Gregg Heschong
- Running time: 22 minutes
- Production companies: Bill Oakley/Josh Weinstein Productions; The Tannenbaum Company; Warner Bros. Television

Original release
- Network: UPN
- Release: September 11, 2003 – March 17, 2004

The Mullets is an American sitcom created by Bill Oakley and Josh Weinstein. Starring Michael Weaver, David Hornsby, Loni Anderson and John O'Hurley, it was produced by Bill Oakley/Josh Weinstein Productions, The Tannenbaum Company and Warner Bros. Television and aired on UPN from September 11, 2003, to March 17, 2004.

== Premise ==
The Mullets are blue-collar, wrestling-loving, light-hearted, optimistic brothers who don the hairstyle that bears their surname ("business in the front, party in the back"). The brothers work as roofers, sport identical mullet haircuts, and have different personalities; Dwayne Mullet (Michael Weaver) has a loud, in-your-face demeanor, while Denny Mullet (David Hornsby) is a quieter, more thoughtful, easygoing guy. The brothers live life to the fullest while dreaming of bigger and better futures, though their fantasies are out of step with their reality.

Their mother, Mandi Mullet-Heidecker (Loni Anderson), is a warm, maternal type who couldn't be more proud of her offspring, no matter what they do. She's recently married to Roger Heidecker (John O'Hurley), a clean-cut game show host who is the polar opposite of her boys and her former life.

== Cast ==
- Michael Weaver as Dwayne Mullet
- David Hornsby as Denny Mullet
- Loni Anderson as Mandi Mullet-Heidecker
- John O'Hurley as Roger Heidecker

== Episodes ==
Eleven episodes were made, but only eight were broadcast.

No.	Title	Directed by	Written by	Original release date	Prod. code	Viewers (millions)
1	"Smackdown"	Gail Mancuso	Bill Oakley, Josh Weinstein	September 11, 2003	177100	3.50
The brothers try to win wrestling tickets in a radio contest for their mother's birthday. A match between The Dudley Boyz (Bubba Ray Dudley and D-Von Dudley) and La Résistance (René Duprée and Sylvain Grenier) was featured.
2	"Love Freakin' Story"	Gail Mancuso	Aaron Ehasz	September 16, 2003	177101	2.34
Dwayne falls for a stuntwoman who knocks him out with one punch.
3	"Raging Waters"	Gail Mancuso	Jordan Hawley, Will Schifrin	September 23, 2003	177102	1.97
Dwayne, Denny and Mendi go on a houseboat vacation on Lake Havasu with Roger, leaving Gordo and Bill to house-sit.
4	"Touched by a Mullet" "Quizzardry"	Gail Mancuso	Sam O'Neal, Neil Boushell	September 30, 2003	177103	2.42
When rain temporarily puts them out of work, Dwayne and Denny volunteer their services to the Quizmaster set, where they try to prove to the staff that Roger can be a fun-loving guy.
5	"Grudge Match"	Gail Mancuso	John O'Bryan	October 7, 2003	177104	1.90
The brothers found their own wrestling league.
6	"Smoke on the Water"	Gail Mancuso	Reid Harrison	October 14, 2003	177105	1.85
Dwayne and Denny try to replace Roger's destroyed Cuban cigars.
7	"Losin' It"	Gail Mancuso	Eric Horsted	March 10, 2004	177109	1.67
Dwayne loses his hair when it gets stuck to the roof with hot tar.
8	"Silent But Deadly" "Silent Treatment"	Dennis Dugan	Patric M. Verrone	March 17, 2004	177107	1.70
The brothers get into trouble with Adam West at a Hollywood party.
9	"Airway to Heaven" "Air Guitar"	Dennis Dugan	Sam O'Neal, Neil Boushell	Unaired	177106	N/A
The guys enter an air-band competition to win the money for their impounded truck.
10	"Sweeeet Emotion" "Melanie + Steve Sharp"	John Blanchard	Aaron Ehasz	Unaired	177108	N/A
After Melanie has a bad date, Dwayne encourages Denny to finally ask her out.
11	"Roger Gone Wild"	John Blanchard	Tom Huang	Unaired	177110	N/A
Roger develops a wild style for Quizmaster.
