= Swinging Spiketaculars =

- Genre: Comedy
- Directed by: Robert Scheerer
- Starring: Spike Jones; Helen Grayco; Bill Dana; Joyce Jameson
- Country of origin: United States
- Original language: English
- No. of seasons: 1
- No. of episodes: 8

Production
- Producer: Bill Dana

Original release
- Network: CBS
- Release: August 1 – September 19, 1960

Related
- Club Oasis

Swinging Spiketaculars is an American comedy program. The series aired on CBS with episodes airing August 1, 1960 – September 19, 1960. The series starred Spike Jones, Helen Grayco and his band The City Slickers. Bill Dana and Joyce Jameson were also part of the regular cast.

The series was the last weekly television series that starred Jones and Grayco. Jones died in 1965 of cancer.

The series was produced by Dana and directed by Robert Scheerer. Guest stars that appeared on the series were Lennie Weinrib, Steve Allen, Jack Jones, and Bud & Travis.

== Episodes ==
- Episode #1.1 – August 1, 1960
- Episode #1.2 – August 8, 1960
- Episode #1.3 – August 15, 1960
- Episode #1.4 – August 22, 1960
- Episode #1.5 – August 29, 1960
- Episode #1.6 – September 5, 1960
- Episode #1.7 – September 12, 1960
- Impersonations – September 19, 1960
