= Helen Grayco =

American singer (1924–2022)

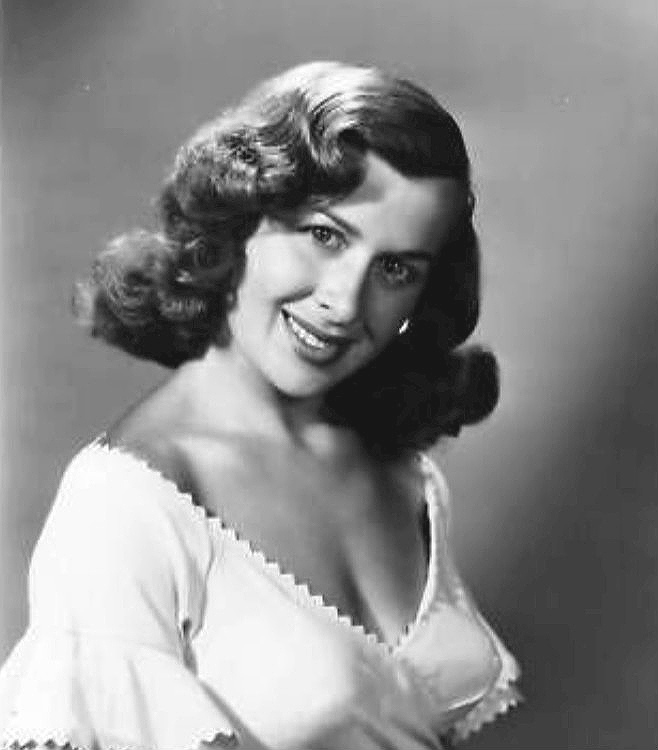
- Grayco on the cover of DownBeat magazine, 1951

Background information
- Born: Helen Greco; September 20, 1924; Tacoma, Washington, U.S.
- Died: August 20, 2022 (aged 97) Los Angeles, California, U.S.
- Genre: Traditional pop
- Occupations: Actress, singer
- Instrument: Vocals
- Years active: 1932–1968
- Spouse: Spike Jones

Helen Grayco (née Greco; September 20, 1924 – August 20, 2022) was an American singer and actress active from the 1930s to the 1960s. She was most famous for appearances with her husband Spike Jones on The Spike Jones Show in the 1950s and the 1960s. She is also the mother of the producer and Emmy recipient Spike Jones, Jr. and the Grammy Award-winning recording engineer Leslie Ann Jones.

== Early life ==
Grayco was born Helen Greco on September 20, 1924, in Tacoma, Washington, the second youngest of 11 children born to Charles Battiste Greco and his wife, Rosina. She had five brothers; John, Ralph, George, Anthony, and James, and five sisters; Mary, Carmella, Katherina, Theresa and Elizabeth. The siblings were raised in the Roman Catholic faith of their parents, Italians who had emigrated to the United States from Lamezia Terme, Calabria. Mr. Greco owned a grocery store which went bankrupt during the Great Depression.

== Career ==
At age 4, Grayco began singing in Tacoma.

=== Radio ===
In 1932, at age eight, Grayco sang on The Carnival Hour, a variety show on radio station KHJ in Los Angeles. She was then hired to appear on a local variety program in Seattle, Washington. Bing Crosby and his brothers, who were, like Grayco, all natives of Tacoma, heard her on the program, and reportedly Crosby said that "...she sings Hollywood!" Crosby gave her a job in Hollywood and soon her family moved to Los Angeles. She earned a salary of $75 a week.

=== Film ===
In 1935, after her collaboration with Crosby ended, Grayco appeared in a non-speaking part in a scene with Allan Jones in the Metro-Goldwyn-Mayer film A Night at the Opera starring the Marx Brothers.

In 1938, Joe Pasternak of Universal Studios signed Grayco, then thirteen, to replace Deanna Durbin as Universal's leading child star. During her stay at Universal, she appeared in a small role in Durbin's film That Certain Age.

=== Musical career ===
==== Early work ====
Grayco began her musical career working with the bands of Chuck Cascalas, Chuck Cabot, and Red Nichols. Her big break came when she began travelling with Stan Kenton's band while still in high school. The tour took Grayco from Los Angeles to the Roseland Ballroom in New York City. While in NYC, in 1947, she was a soloist with the Naumburg Orchestral Concerts, in the Naumburg Bandshell, Central Park, in the summer series.

==== With Spike Jones ====
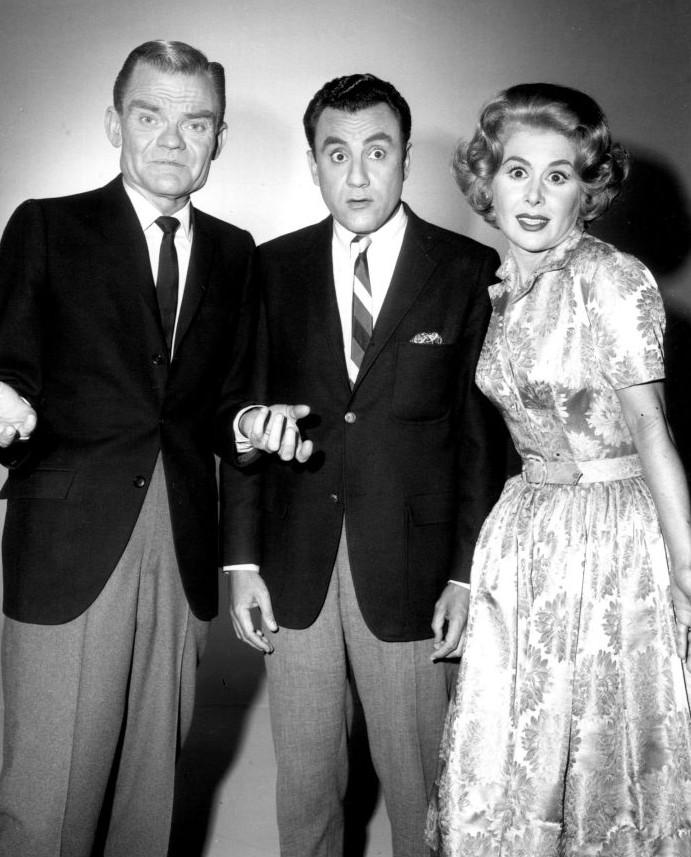
Grayco with Spike Jones and Bill Dana, 1960

Grayco first met the bandleader Spike Jones in 1946 while she was performing at the Hollywood Palladium. After her performance he offered her a gig with his band, the City Slickers.

In a 2009 interview, Grayco had this to say about her first meeting with Spike Jones:

He asked to see me after the show and offered me a job. He was already established. A huge star. He was going on tour. I was in direct contrast to what he did. I was terribly insulted when Spike first asked to hire me. He had just done "Cocktails for Two" and all that stuff that he was known for. "I don't know where I could possibly fit in in your group. I'm not a comedienne," I told him. He said, "No, you'll do your own thing. You'll have your arrangements. You'll do 15, 20 minutes entirely separate from the show." They needed something to calm people down. And that's how we always worked from then on.

Grayco also got a spot with Jones's Other Orchestra, which he formed in 1946. The group was known for its legitimately "pretty" music in contrast to the City Slickers, who were known for their crazy way of performing. The one outstanding recording by the Other Orchestra is "Laura", which features a serious first half (played by the Other Orchestra) and a manic second half (played for laughs by the City Slickers). Even with the success of "Laura", the public preferred the crazy music of the Slickers to the elegant music of the Other Orchestra. The Other Orchestra broke up in 1947, only a year after its founding.

Grayco appeared with Jones and his City Slickers on The Colgate Comedy Hour and The Red Skelton Show. She also starred with Jones and his band on a series of television shows between 1954 and 1961 on NBC and CBS known as The Spike Jones Show and Club Oasis.

=== Solo artist ===
Grayco released her first single in 1949. Her two most memorable albums were After Midnight in 1957 and The Lady in Red in 1958. The latter was the last album she ever released.

=== Later career ===
Grayco continued to sing in various venues for about the next ten years. Her last public appearance was in 1968 on an episode of The Dean Martin Show.

In 1961, Grayco was the spokesperson for Kahlúa coffee liqueur. Her activities included a 13-week tour promoting the product.

After a period of retirement, Grayco briefly resumed recording for United Artists Records in 1976. Her first single for the label was "If That's How Nature Made Him". The song received attention from Billboard editors who deemed it one of the first pop songs with a theme of homosexuality, as it is about a woman who falls in love with a gay man.

== Personal life and death ==
Grayco married Spike Jones on July 18, 1949, in Beverly Hills, California. They had three children: producer Spike Jones Jr., Grammy Award-winning recording engineer Leslie Ann Jones, and Gina Jones. The marriage lasted until Jones's death on May 1, 1965, from emphysema.

In 1968, she married Bill Rosen, who owned a restaurant named Gatsby's in New York City. She moved to New York with him and later moved back to Los Angeles with him when he opened a restaurant called Gatsby's there. Rosen died in 2002.

Grayco died of cancer in Los Angeles on August 20, 2022, at the age of 97.

== Filmography ==
=== Film ===
- A Night at the Opera (Little girl at the piano; uncredited role) (1935)
- That Certain Age (Girl) (1938)
- Cha-Cha-Cha Boom! (Performer: "Lilly's Lament (to Cell 29)") (1956)

=== Television ===
Year	Title	Role	Notes
1951	The Colgate Comedy Hour	Herself	Episode: "The Spike Jones Show"; Original air date: November 2, 1951
1952	Four Star Revue	Guest Vocalist	1 episode
1954	The Spike Jones Show	Herself/Various roles	18 episodes
1955	The Red Skelton Show	Mrs. Spike Jones	1 episode
1957	The Spike Jones Show	Herself	20 episodes
1958	Club Oasis	Singer	3 episodes
1958	The Frank Sinatra Show	Herself	Episode: "Spike Jones and Helen Grayco"; Original air date: April 4, 1958
1960	Swinging Spiketaculars	Herself	2 episodes
1960	Person to Person	Herself	1 episode
1961	The Spike Jones Show	Herself	9 episodes
1968	The Dean Martin Show	Herself	1 episode
1968	The Pat Boone Show	Herself	1 episode
