= George Rock =

American singer

George Rock (October 11, 1919 – April 12, 1988) was a trumpet player and singer with various bands before starring with Spike Jones and His City Slickers.

A man of large physical stature, Rock attended Illinois Wesleyan University in Bloomington, Illinois on a football scholarship. He abandoned football for music, becoming a professional musician at the age of 20. His first national exposure was in the Freddie Fisher's Schnickelfritz Band. In 1944, Spike Jones hired Rock to join his band, the City Slickers.

With Spike Jones and His City Slickers, Rock played trumpet (since he was the only trumpet player) and also sang with the group, noted for imitating children using a voice characterization that sounded remarkably childlike. Rock was featured on many City Slickers recordings including lead vocals on the 1947 classic "All I Want for Christmas Is My Two Front Teeth".

Rock also performed on several other recordings by Spike Jones and the City Slickers including "I'm the Captain of the Space Ship", "You Wanna Buy a Bunny?", "I'm the Angel in the Christmas Play", "Three Little Fishes (Itty Bitty Poo)" and "Happy New Year" (the 'B' side of "All I Want for Christmas Is My Two Front Teeth"). Rock would usually wear a "Little Lord Fauntleroy" children's wardrobe while performing.

Rock also played trumpet on The Spike Jones Show on television in the late 1950s, including the 1958 NBC series Club Oasis.

Rock was the last regular member of The City Slickers to leave the band, remaining until Jones dissolved The City Slickers due to poor health.
