= Luxify =

Hong Kong-based company

Luxify Limited
- Company type: Private
- Industry: Online marketplace
- Founded: 2013
- Founder: Florian Martigny, Alexis Zirah
- Headquarters: Hong Kong, Hong Kong
- Parent: My Fashion Republic Group
- Website: www.luxify.com

Luxify is a Hong Kong–based company, providing an online marketplace for new, vintage and used luxury goods. The company manages an online marketplace website in which members buy and sell a variety of luxury goods. It was Hong Kong's first online marketplace to buy and sell luxury goods The site has over 15 categories, including real estate, watches, jewelry, luxury cars, yachts, aircraft, luxury handbags, art, collectibles, furniture, antiques and fine wines and spirits. As of March 2016, the website had over 22,000 listings from luxury dealers from all over the world, making a US$18.6 billion marketplace. Luxify also has offices in Singapore and London and local partners in Shanghai and Jakarta.

== History ==
The company was founded in 2014 by Hong Kong–based businessmen Florian Martigny and Alexis Zirah to create a global marketplace specifically for luxury products. When the founders were looking to buy luxury products in Hong Kong, they were disappointed when they couldn't locate a reliable online resource, where people could trade items. Realising that most luxury purchases, especially in Asia, were influenced by online touchpoints, they decided to create an online marketplace for new and used luxury products with the aim of creating more liquidity and transparency in the luxury market. They officially launched their website Luxify.com in 2014. Luxify received its angel funding round from private investors located in Asia and Europe to continue its global expansion. Luxify was named one of Asia's most promising internet companies in 2015. The company also partners with luxury goods companies to widen their market and reach. In June 2015, Luxify partnered with Landscope Christie's International Real Estate to offer consultative service for clients who wish to purchase the finest overseas vineyard properties. Also, seeing Philippines as being one of the greatest economic growth countries in Asia, Luxify teamed up with Salcedo Auctions, which is the only auction house in the Philippines to specialise in the sale of fine art, jewelry, decorative arts and collective accessories, to promote its upcoming Collector's Sale auction. In October the same year, Luxify partnered with Zachy Wine Auction for its final auction of the Fall 2015 Hong Kong season to showcase collections of some of the finest wines and spirits.

== Notable listings ==
Apart from listing famous brand items like supercars and classic cars from Rolls-Royce, Ferrari and Porsche; and classic watches from Hublot and Rolex; Luxify also has notable and special listings:

- August 2016: one of the most complete and highest-quality tyrannosaurus rex skulls – "Rees Rex" was listed on Luxify, for at least $1.8 million US dollars. Separately, a mounted triceratops prorsus skeleton, with a reserve of around $790,000 US dollars; and a mounted tyrannosaurus rex skeleton priced at $2.39 million; were also listed. The fossils were discovered by Theropoda Expeditions, a private American dinosaur fossil exploration firm, in 2015.
- December 2015: The former home of famous pop star Michael Jackson, Neverland, was listed on Luxify after it was on the market for sale for six months and failed to attract local buyers. It was listed on Luxify for around US$100 million with the aim of targeting Asia's super wealthy.
- December 2015: Michael Jordan’s estate in Highland Park was also listed on Luxify.
