= Spike Jones Jr. =

American television producer and director (born 1949)

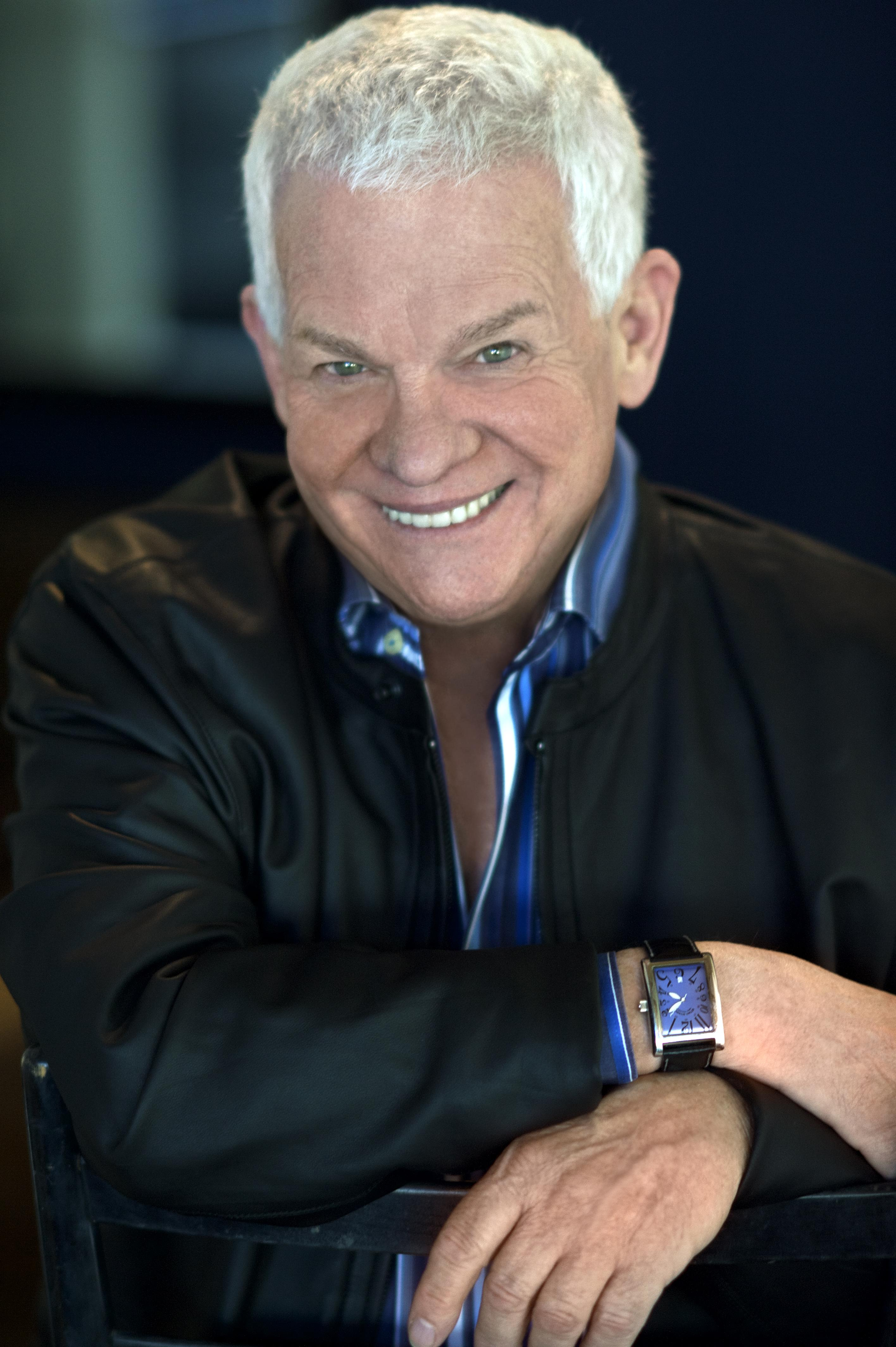
- Jones Jr. in 2012
- Born: Lindley Armstrong Jones Jr. May 19, 1949 (age 76); Beverly Hills, California, U.S.
- Occupations: Producer; director
- Years active: 1965–present

Lindley Armstrong "Spike" Jones Jr. (born May 19, 1949) is an American television producer and director of award shows and live television events. He is a public speaker and frequent moderator and panel participant for entertainment industry events, and the founder of SJ2 Entertainment. He is the son of satirical musician and bandleader Spike Jones and singer and actress Helen Grayco, and has three sisters, including Grammy-winning recording engineer Leslie Ann Jones.

== Early life ==
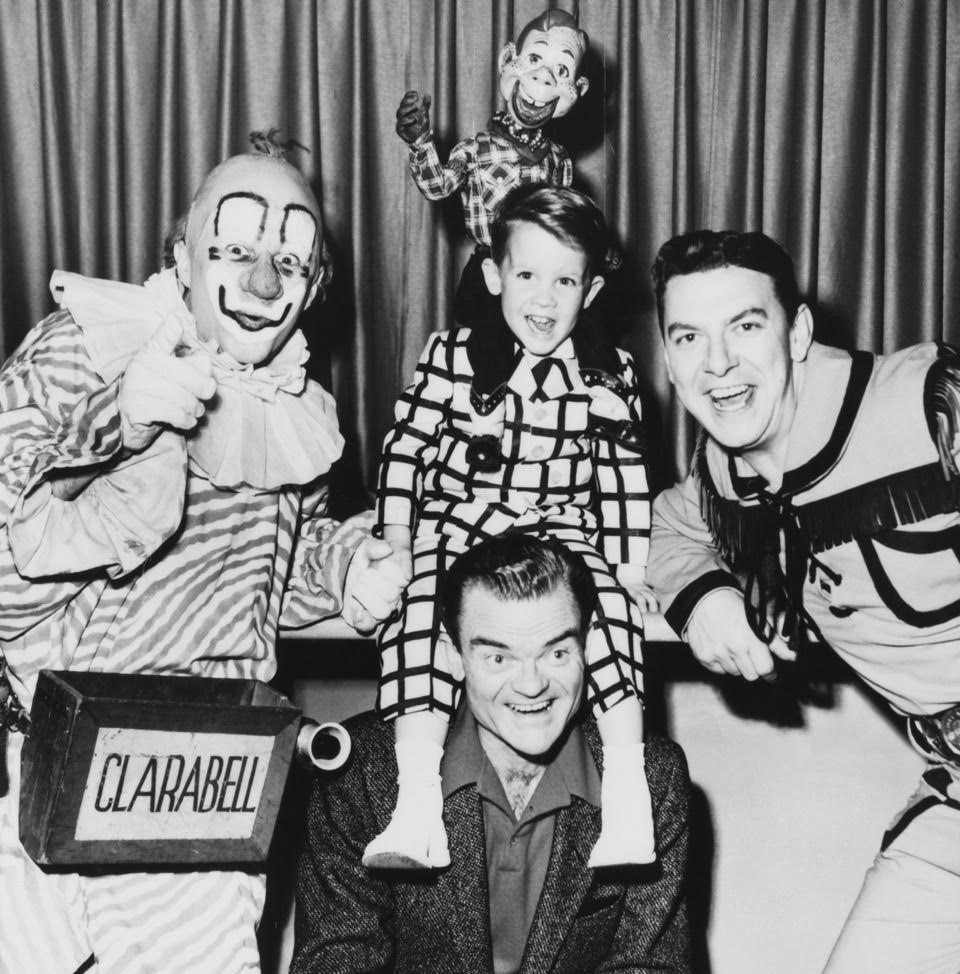
Spike Jones Sr. and Jr. on the Howdy Doody set

Jones Jr. was born into a show business family, and had a childhood career as a musician and performer. His father, satirical musician Spike Jones, led the band Spike Jones and his City Slickers. They recorded numerous hit parody songs from the 1940s through the early 1960s. His mother, singer and actress Helen Grayco, often performed in her husband's stage and television shows. Jones Jr. and his sisters spent much time on the road visiting their parents during the summer months.

In early 1965, at age 15, Jones Jr. briefly took over as bandleader when his father became too ill to perform. At that time, the band was called Spike Jones and the Band That Plays for Fun. Jones Jr. had watched his father's act so many times, he knew where every gunshot, horn honk and glug went. During the following months, when his father returned to work doing three shows a night in Vegas and Lake Tahoe, Jones Sr. would perform the first two shows, and Jones Jr. would lead the band during the third show. When his father died on May 1, 1965, Jones Jr. once again stepped in and led the band for a number of scheduled performances.

== Career ==
For 20 years he produced the Primetime Creative Arts Emmy Awards for The Television Academy taking it from a dinner-dance held in a convention hall to a nationally telecast primetime production, emanating from the Microsoft Theater at LA Live. For five consecutive years, he produced the Emmy Awards Nominations Announcement Ceremony.

He produced the 41st Daytime Emmy Awards and has produced and directed projects for HBO, Oxygen, Showtime, A&E Networks, MTV, VH1, NBC, E!, Nickelodeon, IFC, and ABC. These include the Film Independent Spirit Awards, Writers Guild of America Awards, Jerry Lewis Telethon, the Spike Video Game Awards, the Red Carpet for the TV Land Awards, and The Closer series finale.

Jones Jr. entered the arena of online gaming by directing Blizzard Entertainment's premiere release of World of Warcraft: Warlords of Draenor Cinematic Reveal in 2014.

Jones Jr. lectures, mentors and presents seminars for the Television Academy's educational and charitable arm, the Academy of Television Arts & Sciences Foundation (ATAS). In 2015 he executive-produced the Foundation's College Television Awards. In 2015, Jones was presented with the Syd Cassyd Founders Emmy Award by ATAS his work and contribution its behalf.

In 2014 Jones Jr. produced and directed SCORE: A Concert of Music Composed for Television, a one-off orchestral concert at Royce Hall featuring a range of iconic television theme music from Game of Thrones to Family Guy, all conducted by the composers of each popular theme.
