= Spike Jones in Stereo =

Studio album by Spike Jones
- Released: 1959
- Genre: Comedy
- Label: Warner Bros.
- Producer: Alvino Rey

Professional ratings
Review scores
Source	Rating
Allmusic	link

Spike Jones in Stereo (also known as Spike Jones in Hi-Fi and A Spooktacular in Screaming Sound) (1959) is a comedy album by musical-satirist Spike Jones. Unlike his previous recordings, which make fun of genres such as Christmas and classical music, Spike Jones in Stereo is a send up of everything horror.

Making a notable guest appearance on the album is Paul Frees, who plays the voice of Dracula, Doctor Von Steiner, and one of the heads on the two headed monster. Loulie Jean Norman, Thurl Ravenscroft, and George Rock (the voice on Jones's only number one hit "All I Want for Christmas (Is My Two Front Teeth)") also lend their voices.

The album was the first of Spike Jones original releases to have been re-issued on CD.

== Track listing ==
1. "I Only Have Eyes for You" – 3.30
2. "Poisen to Poisen" – 4.39
3. "Teenage Brain Surgeon" – 3.03
4. "(All of a Sudden) My Heart Sings" – 3.13
5. "Everything Happens to Me" – 3.48
6. "Monster Movie Ball" – 2.45
7. "Tammy" – 4.19
8. "My Old Flame" – 4.22
9. "This Is Your Death/Two Heads Are Better Than One" – 9.24
10. "Spooktacular Finale" – 2.34

== Personnel ==
- Spike Jones – drums, vocals, bandleader
- Paul Frees – vocals, impersonations
- Loulie Jean Norman – vocals, impersonations
- Thurl Ravenscroft – vocals
- George Rock – trumpet, vocals
- Ken Stevens – vocals

== Production ==
- Producer: Alvino Rey
- Executive Producer: Gordon Anderson
- Engineer: Thorne Nogar
- Editing: Thorne Nogar
- Mixing: Thorne Nogar
- Mastering: Bob Fisher
- Arranging: Carl Brandt, Spike Jones
- Cover Art: Jim Jonson
- Cover Painting: Jim Jonson
- Liner Notes: Joseph F. Laredo
