= Paul Garner =

American actor (1909–2004)

Paul "Mousie" Garner
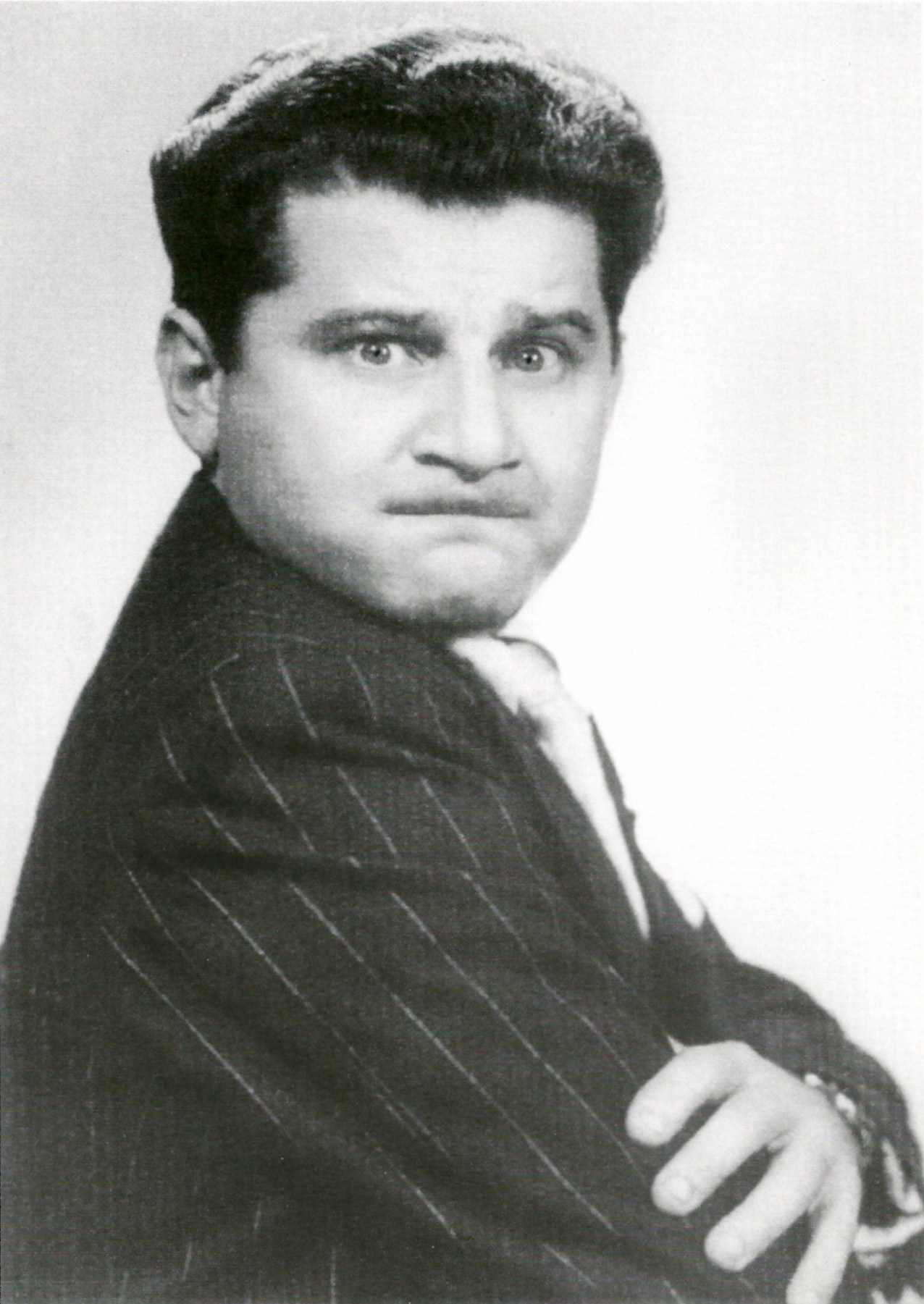
- Garner in 1932
- Born: Paul Albert Garner; July 31, 1909; Washington, D.C., U.S.
- Died: August 8, 2004 (aged 95); Glendale, California, U.S.
- Resting place: Bnai Israel Cemetery, Oxon Hill, Maryland
- Other name: The Grand Old Man Of Vaudeville
- Occupation: Actor
- Years active: 1913–2004

Paul Albert "Mousie" Garner (July 31, 1909 – August 8, 2004) was an American actor. Garner earned his nickname by assuming the role of a shy, simpering jokester. He was one of the last actors still doing shtick from vaudeville, and has been referred to as "The Grand Old Man Of Vaudeville."

== Biography ==
He was born on July 31, 1909, in Washington, D.C.

In addition to big-time vaudeville, Mousie Garner appeared on Broadway and in major national touring companies; in short subjects, feature films and documentaries; on network television, cable and radio shows; and in nightclubs, auditoriums and concert halls.

Mousie Garner made his stage debut as a child in 1913, singing, dancing and imitating Al Jolson in a family musical-comedy act developed by his father. While still a child, Garner entertained soldiers during World War I. By the time he was a teenager in the 1920s, he had already decided upon a career on the vaudeville stage.

== Mousie Garner and the Three Stooges ==
Stage star Ted Healy worked with three rowdy stooges (showbiz slang for "assistants"): Moe Howard, Larry Fine, and Shemp Howard (and later Curly Howard). When Howard, Fine, and Howard chose to work on their own, first in 1930 and later in 1934 as "The Three Stooges", Healy promptly replaced them with three new stooges. Mousie Garner worked alongside his cousin, Jack Wolf (father of Warner Wolf) and Richard "Dick" Hakins between 1922 and 1936. Mousie Garner continued working on stage and on screen with Dick Hakins, and either his cousin Jack Wolf or Wolf's replacement, Sammy Wolfe, in a musical comedy trio known as The Gentlemaniacs (aka: Garner, Wolf [or Wolfe] and Hakins) throughout the 1920s and '30s. The Gentlemaniacs starred in several feature films and short subjects including After the Show (1929), Swing It, Professor (1937), The Hit Parade (1937), Murder with Reservations (1938) and Radio and Relatives (1940). Garner, however, almost became one of the Three Stooges on two occasions.

According to Garner's autobiography, after Shemp Howard died suddenly in November 1955, Moe Howard and Larry Fine wanted Garner to join them in 1956, but Garner was then under contract to Spike Jones as a musical comedian with Jones's band, the City Slickers. Despite Moe Howard pleading his case to Jones personally, Jones would not release Garner; Joe Besser would eventually replace Shemp in 1956. The claim in Garner's autobiography cannot be accepted as a whole truth since a similar story can be found in Moe's autobiography, but with Joe DeRita as the protagonist instead of Garner and Harold Minsky instead of Jones. After Besser quit the act in 1958, Larry suggested Garner again as a potential replacement and he and Moe would later rehearse with Garner. However, based on his tryout performance, Moe later remarked that Garner was "completely unacceptable" for the act. Joe DeRita would instead become the "third stooge" in October 1958. Nevertheless, in the early 1970s, DeRita, with Moe's blessing, would invite Garner and Frank Mitchell to join the "New Three Stooges" act, filling in for the ailing Larry and Moe, respectively.

== Entertaining the troops ==
Serving in the U.S. Army during World War II, Garner was shipped overseas and he achieved the rank of technical sergeant before completing his term. He participated in the Allied forces' North African campaign, and was injured twice on duty. He received several commendations and after recovering from his wartime injuries, Garner joined the U.S.O. to star in Ole Olsen and Chic Johnson's "Sons O' Fun", the touring version of "Hellzapoppin'". The show was staged for servicemen throughout Europe during the Allies' postwar occupation. Garner's service in the U.S.O. would continue throughout both the Korean and Vietnam conflicts, as he continued to entertain the troops throughout the 1950s and '60s.

While living in Los Angeles in the 1950s and 1960s, Garner continued to work as a comic with the U.S.O., as a touring solo and ensemble stage comedian and as a television performer.

== Television ==
Garner appeared on The Colgate Comedy Hour, The Jack Benny Program, Cavalcade of Stars, The Jackie Gleason Show, The NBC Comedy Hour, and Perry Como's Kraft Music Hall throughout the 1950s.

By the 1960s, Garner was a popular character actor on such television programs as Maverick, Alcoa Presents: One Step Beyond, Lock Up, Surfside 6, The Many Loves of Dobie Gillis, 77 Sunset Strip, Wendy and Me, The Munsters, Petticoat Junction, No Time For Sergeants, Mister Roberts, Honey West, Mr. Terrific, I Dream of Jeannie, Get Smart, and Julia. Throughout the 1970s, Garner continued to appear on television variety shows like The Red Skelton Show and The Bobby Vinton Show. In the 1980s, Garner continued to accept bit roles on such television programs as CHiPs, Brothers, and Emmy Award winning Amazing Stories.

In 1964, Garner appeared in the film For Those Who Think Young and also played a bit part in Last of the Red Hot Lovers in 1972. That same year, Garner appeared in the made-for-TV movie Goodnight, My Love which was followed by his appearance in Frasier, the Sensuous Lion (1973) and Prime Time a.k.a. American Raspberry (1977). In 1980, Garner appeared in the made-for-TV movie The Dream Merchants as well as Cheech and Chong's Next Movie (1980). In 1981, Garner was featured in the Richard Benjamin film Saturday the 14th and would go on to play bit parts in Rhinestone (1984) and Avenging Angel (1985). Garner also played Billy Crystal's Uncle Lou in Billy Crystal: A Comic's Line (1984) and a zany cameraman in David Lee Roth's "Just a Gigolo" (1985) music video. In 1985, Garner played a bit part in the film Stoogemania. In 1988, Garner appeared with Sid Caesar, Danny Thomas and Milton Berle in the made-for-TV film Side By Side. In 1994 he appeared in the film Radioland Murders as an homage to his work with Spike Jones and His City Slickers. He also appeared as Uncle Smackers, a character in The Onion Movie, a feature film produced by David Zucker, renowned for Airplane! and the Naked Gun series, which was released in 2008.

Garner enjoyed a successful 75-year career as a comedian and show business professional.

Mousie Garner appears in several entertainment biographies including Spike Jones and His City Slickers: An Illustrated Biography, Moe Howard & The Three Stooges, The Stooge Chronicles, and The Stoogephile Trivia Book, and in 2002 he wrote the introduction to The Three Stooges: The Triumphs and Tragedies of The Most Popular Comedy Team of All Time. His autobiography, entitled Mousie Garner: Autobiography of a Vaudeville Stooge, was published in 1999. His nephew, Stephen Garner, a professional magician from Maryland, supplied most of the pictures for the book.

== Death ==
After suffering from kidney problems, Garner died on August 8, 2004, at Verdugo Hills Hospital in Glendale, California, just over a week after his 95th birthday. Garner was interred with his family at the Bnai Israel Cemetery in Oxon Hill, Maryland. He was the last major celebrity associated with Ted Healy and the Three Stooges to die.

== Filmography ==
Year	Title	Role	Notes
1934	Operator 13	Union Soldier	Uncredited
1937	Swing It, Professor	Member, The Gentlemaniacs	
1937	The Hit Parade	Member, The Gentlemaniacs	
1959	The Rookie	Waiter	Uncredited
1964	For Those Who Think Young	Mousie	
1972	Last of the Red Hot Lovers	Waiter #2	
1973	Frasier, the Sensuous Lion	Man in Bar	
1977	Prime Time a.k.a. American Raspberry	Nostalgic Old Person	
1980	Cheech and Chong's Next Movie	Executive	
1981	Saturday the 14th	The Major	
1984	Rhinestone	Rhinestone Heckler	
1985	Avenging Angel	Joe Borenstein	
1985	Stoogemania	Arcade Owner	
1994	Radioland Murders	Double bass performer	
2008	The Onion Movie	Uncle Smackers	(final film role)

== Television ==
Year	Title	Role	Notes
1965	The Munsters	Fingers Malone	S1:E21, "Don't Bank on Herman"
1966	The Monkees	Benny	S1:E11, "Monkees à la Carte"
