= Spike Jones =

American actor, comedian, musician, bandleader and conductor (1911–1965)

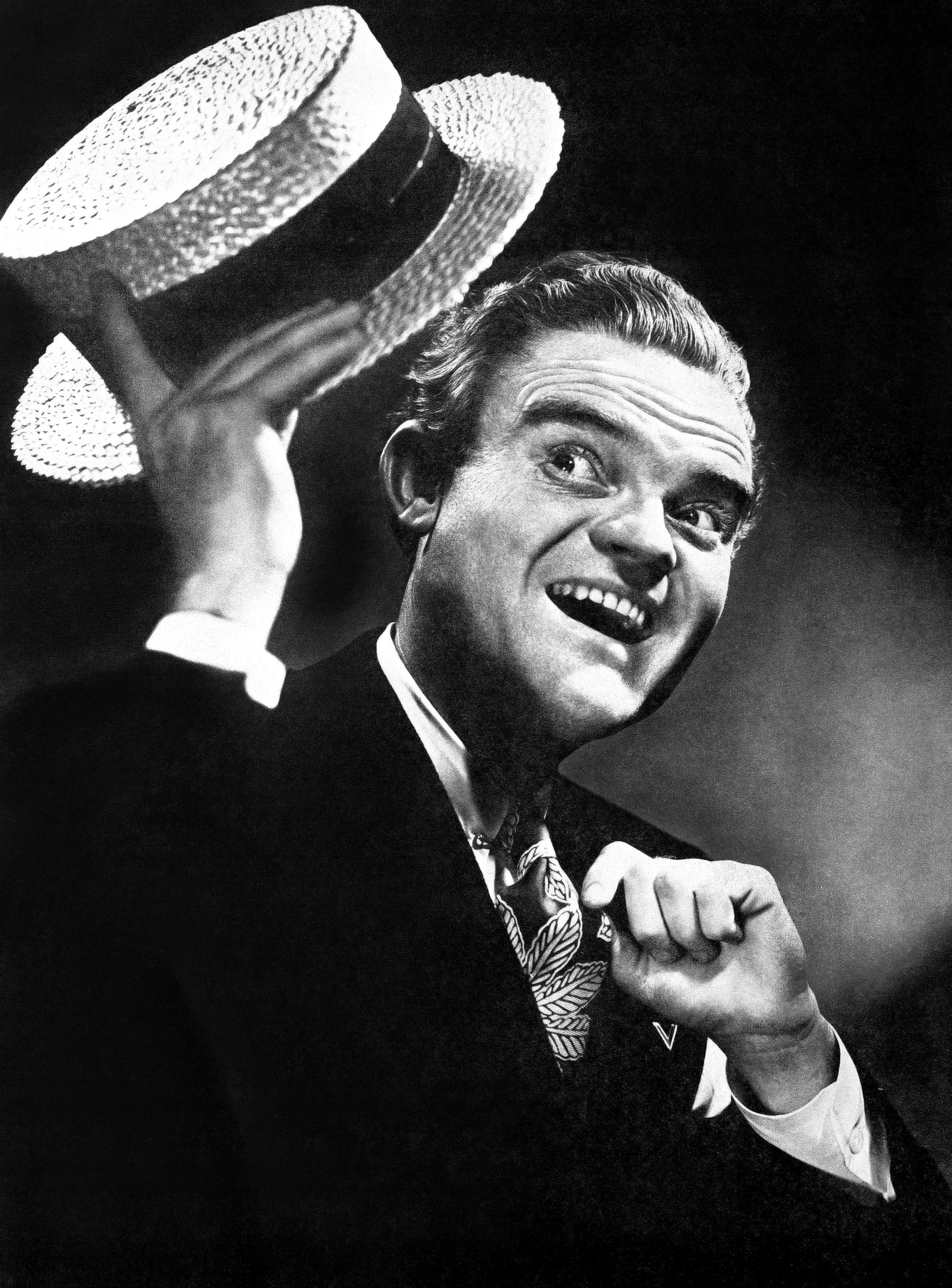
- Jones, c. 1945–46
- Born: Lindley Armstrong Jones; December 14, 1911; Long Beach, California, U.S.
- Died: May 1, 1965 (aged 53); Beverly Hills, California, U.S.
- Occupations: musician; bandleader; conductor; actor
- Years active: 1930s–1965
- Spouses: Patricia Middleton (m. 1935; div. 1946) Helen Grayco (m. 1949)
- Children: Spike Jones Jr. Leslie Ann Jones

Lindley Armstrong "Spike" Jones (December 14, 1911 – May 1, 1965) was an American musician, bandleader and conductor specializing in spoof arrangements and satire of popular songs and classical music. Ballads receiving the Jones treatment were punctuated with various sound effects, including gunshots, whistles, cowbells, hiccups, burps, sneezes, animal sounds and outlandish and comedic vocals. Jones and his band recorded for RCA Victor under the title Spike Jones and His City Slickers from the early 1940s to the mid-1950s, and they toured the United States and Canada as "The Musical Depreciation Revue".

== Early years ==
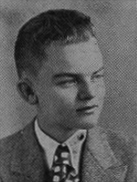
Jones as a senior at Long Beach Polytechnic High School, 1929

Lindley Armstrong Jones was born in Long Beach, California, the son of Ada (Armstrong), a teacher, and Lindley Murray Jones, a Southern Pacific railroad agent. Young Lindley Jones was given the nickname 'Spike' for being so thin that he was compared to a railroad spike. At the age of 11 he got his first set of drums. As a teenager he played in bands that he formed himself; Jones's first band was called Spike Jones and his Five Tacks. A railroad restaurant chef taught him how to use pots and pans, forks, knives and spoons as musical instruments. Jones frequently played in theater pit orchestras. In the 1930s, he joined the Victor Young orchestra and got many offers to appear on radio shows, including Al Jolson's Lifebuoy Program, Burns and Allen, and Bing Crosby's Kraft Music Hall.

== Spike Jones and His City Slickers ==
Jones became bored playing the same music each night with the orchestras. He found other like-minded musicians and they began playing parodies of standard songs for their own entertainment. The musicians wanted their wives to share their enjoyment, so they recorded their weekly performances. One of the recordings made its way into the hands of an RCA Victor executive, who offered the musicians a recording contract. One of the City Slickers' early recordings for the label was a Del Porter arrangement of "Der Fuehrer's Face". The record's success inspired Jones to become the band's leader. He initially thought the popularity the record brought them would fade. However, audiences kept asking for more, so Jones started working on more comic arrangements.

From 1937 to 1942, Jones was the percussionist for the John Scott Trotter Orchestra, which played on Bing Crosby's first recording of "White Christmas". He was part of a backing band for songwriter Cindy Walker during her early recording career with Decca Records and Standard Transcriptions. Her song "We're Gonna Stomp Them City Slickers Down" provided the inspiration for the name of Jones's future band.

The City Slickers developed from the Feather Merchants, a band led by vocalist and clarinetist Del Porter, who took a back seat to Jones during the group's embryonic years. They made experimental records for the Cinematone Corporation and performed publicly in Los Angeles, gaining a small following. Original members included vocalist–violinist Carl Grayson, banjoist Perry Botkin, trombonist King Jackson, and pianist Stan Wrightsman.

The band's early records were issued on RCA Victor's budget-priced Bluebird label, but were soon moved to the more-prestigious Victor label. They recorded extensively for the company until 1955. They also starred in various radio programs (1945–1949) and in their own NBC and CBS television shows from 1954 to 1961.

=== Orchestra members ===
September 14, 1949, appearance of Spike Dyke, modeled on Spike Jones, in Chester Gould's Dick Tracy

During the 1940s, prominent band members included:

- George Rock (trumpet, and vocals from 1944 to 1960)
- Mickey Katz (clarinet, vocals)
- Doodles Weaver (vocals – specialized in playing sports commentators and absentminded singers who persistently scrambled their lyrics into malapropisms and digressed into stand-up comedy)
- Red Ingle (tenor saxophone, clarinet, violin, vocals)
- Frank Rehak (trombone)
- Del Porter (clarinet, vocals)
- Carl Grayson (violin, vocals)
- Perry Botkin (banjo)
- Country Washburne (tuba)
- Luther "Red" Roundtree (banjo)
- Earl Bennett, a.k.a. Sir Frederick Gas (vocals)
- Joe Siracusa (drums)
- Joe Colvin (trombone)
- Roger Donley (tuba)
- Dick Gardner (baritone sax, clarinet, violin)
- Paul Leu (piano)
- Jack Golly (alto saxophone, clarinet)
- John Stanley (trombone)
- Don Anderson (trumpet)
- Charlotte Tinsley (harp)
- Eddie Metcalfe (saxophone, clarinet)
- Dick Morgan (banjo), a.k.a. I. W. Harper
- Frederick Morganstern (banjo, vocals), a.k.a. Freddy Morgan
- George Lescher (piano)
- A. Purvis Pullen, a.k.a. Dr. Horatio Q. Birdbath (bird calls, dog barks)
- Russ "Candy" Hall (bass, tuba)

The band's 1950s personnel included:

- Helen Grayco (vocals)
- Earl Bennett, as Sir Frederick Gas
- Billy Barty (standing 3' 9", vocals and comedy routines, including impersonations of Liberace)
- Lock Martin (standing 7', comedy routines)
- Freddy Morgan (banjo)
- Peter James (vocals; sometimes billed as Bobby Pinkus)
- Jad Paul (banjo)
- Gil Bernal (sax, vocals)
- Paul "Mousie" Garner (vocals)
- Bernie Jones (sax, vocals)
- Phil Gray (trombone)
- Marilyn Olsen Oliveri (vocals, harp)

The liner notes for at least two RCA compilation albums claimed that the two Morgans were brothers (the 1949 radio shows actually billed them as "Dick and Freddy Morgan"), but this was not true; Freddy's real name was Morgenstern.

Peter James (born Peter James Accardy, sometimes billed as Bobby Pinkus) and Paul "Mousie" Garner were former members of Ted Healy's stage act on Broadway. James joined Healy for a two-year run in the Shubert revue A Night in Spain (1927–1928) where he worked alongside Shemp Howard and Larry Fine. Mousie joined Healy as a replacement stooge in the 1930s, after the original Three Stooges left Healy for movie work.

Spike Jones's second wife, singer Helen Grayco, performed in his stage and television shows.

== Record hits ==
=== "Der Fuehrer's Face" ===
A strike by the American Federation of Musicians in 1942 prevented Jones from making commercial recordings for over two years. He could, however, make records for radio broadcasts. These were released on the Standard Transcriptions label (1941–1946) and have been reissued on a CD compilation called (Not) Your Standard Spike Jones Collection.

Recorded just days before the recording ban, Jones scored a huge broadcast hit late in 1942 with "Der Fuehrer's Face", a song ridiculing Adolf Hitler, which followed every use of the word "Heil" with a derisive raspberry sound, as in the repeated phrase "Heil, (raspberry), Heil (raspberry), right in Der Fuehrer's face!".

=== More spoof songs ===
Spike Jones and His City Slickers: Cocktails for Two
16-second sample, as the musical mayhem begins

The romantic ballad "Cocktails for Two", originally written to evoke an intimate romantic rendezvous, was re-recorded by Spike Jones in 1944 as a raucous, horn-honking, voice-gurgling, hiccuping hymn to the cocktail hour. The Jones version was a huge hit.

Other Jones spoofs followed: "Hawaiian War Chant", "Chloe", "Holiday for Strings", "You Always Hurt the One You Love", "My Old Flame" and "Laura".

=== "Ghost Riders" ===
Spike's 1949 parody of Vaughn Monroe's rendition of "Ghost Riders in the Sky" was performed as if sung by a drunkard and ridiculed Monroe by name in its final stanza:

CHORUS: ...'cause all we hear is "Ghost Riders" sung by Vaughn Monroe.
I.W. HARPER: I can do without his singing.

SIR FREDERICK GAS: But I wish I had his dough!

Vaughn Monroe, a popular RCA Victor recording artist and also a major RCA stockholder, demanded the dig be edited out of the recording. The original, unedited version was released by HMV in the European market. (A limited number of unedited RCA Victor 78 rpm pressings were mistakenly distributed on the West Coast and are a prized rarity today.) The original recording with the unedited ending was later issued on a German RCA LP collection and on some CD and audio tape releases.

=== "Trailer Annie" ===
In the 1940s, Spike also recorded a comedic song titled "Trailer Annie", about a woman who tries to find a job in the United States military.

=== "All I Want for Christmas" ===
Jones's recording, "All I Want for Christmas Is My Two Front Teeth", with a piping vocal by George Rock, was recorded in 1947, too late for that year's shopping season; the record was withheld and was finally released in the fall of 1948, becoming a number-one hit. (Dora Bryan recorded a 1963 variation, "All I Want For Christmas is a Beatle".)

=== Murdering the Classics ===
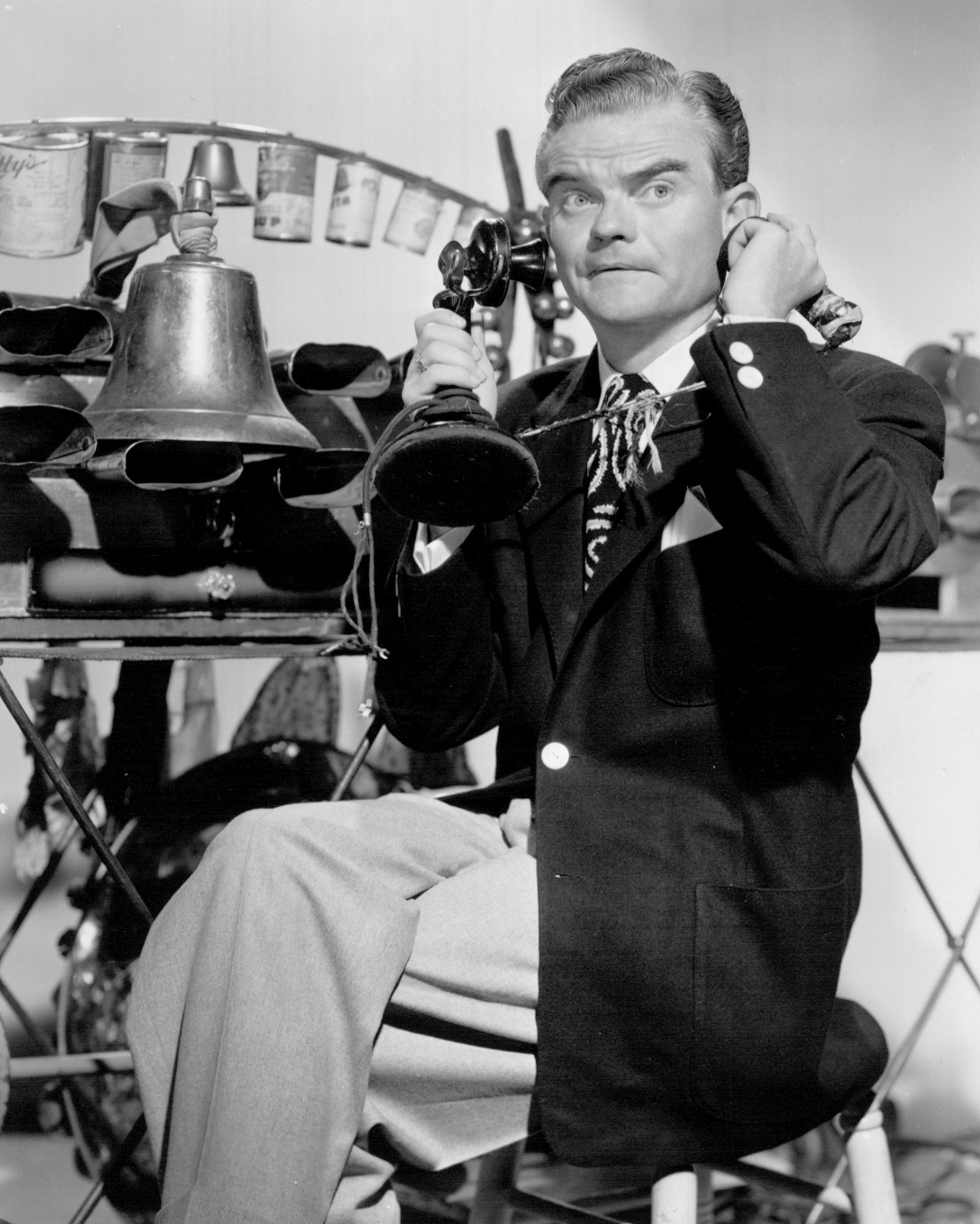
Jones with some of his musical instruments – empty tin cans – in the background

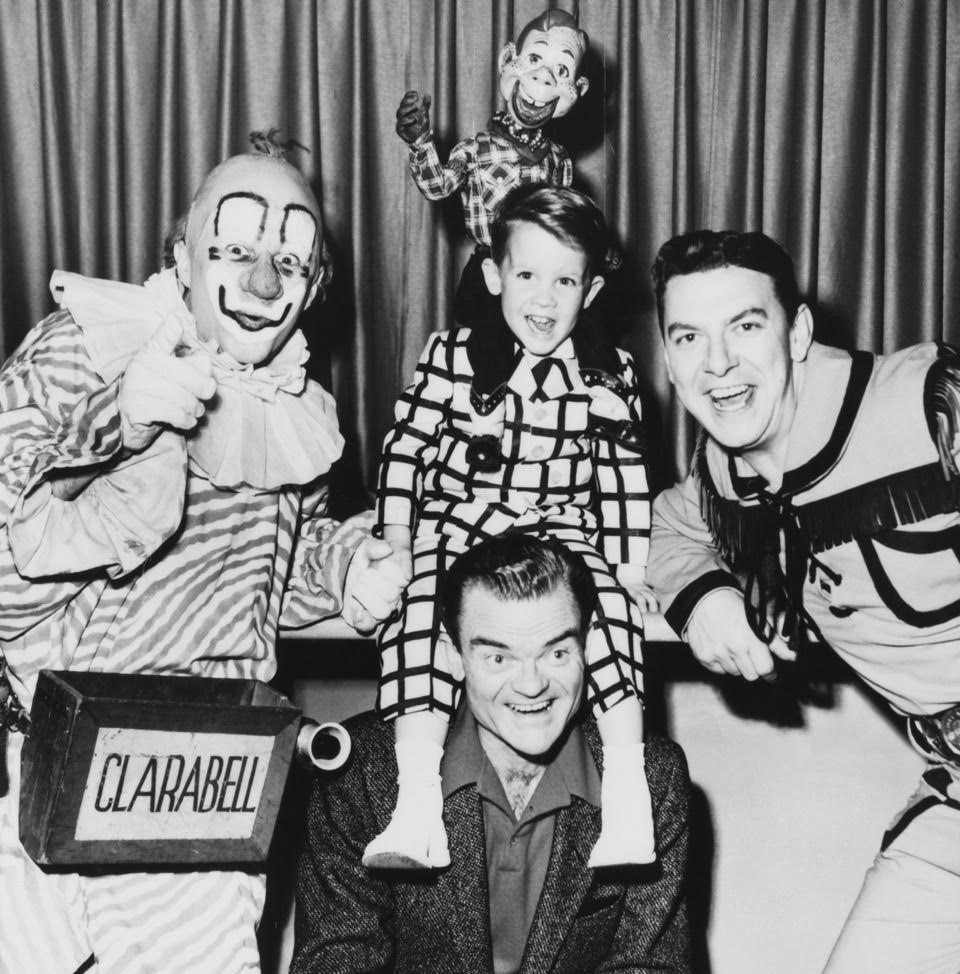
Spike Jones, Jr. and Sr. with Howdy Doody

Among the recordings Spike Jones and his City Slickers made in the 1940s were many humorous takes on classical music such as the adaptation of Liszt's Liebestraum No. 3, played at a breakneck pace on unusual instruments. Others followed: Rossini's William Tell Overture was rendered on kitchen implements using a horse race as a backdrop, with one of the "horses" in the "race" likely to have inspired the nickname of the lone chrome yellow-painted SNJ aircraft flown by the U.S. Navy's Blue Angels aerobatic team's shows in the late 1940s, "Beetle Bomb". In live shows Spike would acknowledge the applause with complete solemnity, saying "Thank you, music lovers." In 1971, RCA issued an LP (on the prestigious Red Seal label) compilation of twelve of these "homicides", titled Spike Jones Is Murdering the Classics. The album includes such tours de force as Pal-Yat-Chee (featuring the hillbilly satirists Homer and Jethro), Ponchielli's Dance of the Hours, Tchaikovsky's None but the Lonely Heart, Strauss's Blue Danube waltz, and Bizet's Carmen.

In 1944, RCA Victor released "Spike Jones presents for the Kiddies" version of Tchaikovsky's Nutcracker Suite, in three 10-inch, 78 rpm records, P-143, arrangement credited to Joe "Country" Washburne with lyrics by Foster Carling. The set was also issued by RCA Victor on three 7-inch vinyl 45 rpm records in 1949 as WP-143 and on one 45 rpm "extended play" record, EPA-143 in 1952. An abridged and re-sequenced version of the recording is also included in the aforementioned RCA Red Seal 'classics' album, with the complete original version available on the CD collection Spiked: The Music of Spike Jones.

== Radio ==
After appearing as the house band on The Bob Burns Show, Spike got his own radio show on NBC, The Chase and Sanborn Program, as Edgar Bergen's summer replacement in 1945. Frances Langford was co-host and Groucho Marx was among the guests. The guest list for Jones's 1947–49 CBS program for Coca-Cola (originally The Spotlight Revue, retitled The Spike Jones Show for its final season) included Frankie Laine, Mel Torme, Peter Lorre, Frank Sinatra appeared on the show twice (October 1, 1948, and December 3, 1948) and Lassie in May 1949. Jones's resident "girl singer" during this period was Dorothy Shay, "The Park Avenue Hillbillie." One of the announcers on Jones's CBS show was the young Mike Wallace. Writers included Eddie Maxwell, Eddie Brandt, and Jay Sommers. The final program in the series was broadcast on June 25, 1949, with Don Ameche.

== Spike Jones and His Other Orchestra ==
While Jones enjoyed the fame and prosperity, he was annoyed that nobody seemed to see beyond the craziness. Determined to show the world that he was capable of producing legitimate "pretty" music, he formed a second group in 1946. Spike Jones and His Other Orchestra played lush arrangements of dance hits. This alternate group played nightclub engagements and was an artistic success, but the paying public preferred the City Slickers and stayed away. Jones wound up paying some of the band's expenses out of his own pocket. Some of the City Slickers band members appeared and recorded with the Other Orchestra, but most of the Other Orchestra personnel consisted of "serious", accomplished studio musicians from the Los Angeles area.

The one outstanding recording by the Other Orchestra is "Laura", which features a serious first half (played exquisitely by the Other Orchestra) and a manic second half (played for laughs by the City Slickers).

Jones's son, Spike Jones Jr., called attention to the precision of his father's most outlandish musical arrangements: "One of the things that people don't realize about Dad's kind of music is, when you replace a C-sharp with a gunshot, it has to be a C-sharp gunshot or it sounds awful."

== Movies ==
In 1940, Jones had an uncredited bandleading part in the Dead End Kids film Give Us Wings, appearing on camera for about four seconds.

As the band's fame grew, Hollywood producers hired the Slickers as a specialty act for feature films, including Thank Your Lucky Stars (1943), Meet the People (1944), Bring on the Girls (1945), Breakfast in Hollywood (1946) and Variety Girl (1947). Jones was set to team with Abbott and Costello for a 1954 Universal Pictures comedy, but when Lou Costello withdrew for medical reasons, Universal replaced the comedy team with look-alikes Hugh O'Brian and Buddy Hackett, and promoted Jones to the leading role. The finished film, Fireman Save My Child, turned out to be Spike Jones's only top-billed theatrical movie.

== Soundies ==
In 1942, the Jones gang worked on numerous soundies, musical shorts similar to later music videos which were shown on coin-operated projectors in small nightclubs, arcades, malt shops, and taverns. The band appeared on camera under their own name in four of the Soundies ("Clink! Clink! Another Drink", "Pass the Biscuits, Mirandy", "The Sheik of Araby", and "Blacksmith Song"), and, according to musicologist Mark Cantor, provided background music for at least thirteen others. Mel Blanc, the voice of Bugs Bunny and other Warner Brothers cartoon characters, performed a drunken, hiccuping verse for 1942's "Clink! Clink! Another Drink" (reissued in 1949 as "The Clink! Clink! Polka").

== Television ==
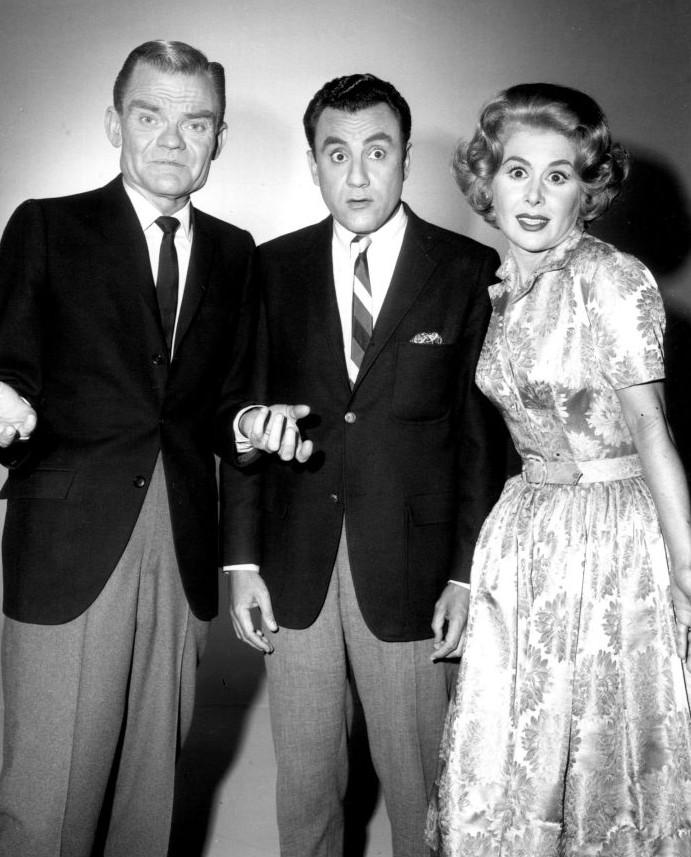
Jones and his wife, Helen Grayco, with Bill Dana in 1960. Dana wrote and produced the summer replacement show, as well as performed on it.

Jones saw the potential of television and filmed two half-hour pilot films, Foreign Legion and Wild Bill Hiccup, in the summer of 1950. Veteran comedy director Eddie Cline worked on both, but neither was successful. The band fared much better on live television, where their spontaneous antics and crazy visual gags guaranteed the viewers a good time. Spike usually dressed in a suit with an enormous check pattern and was seen dashing around playing a washboard, cowbells, a suite of klaxons and foghorns, then xylophone, then shooting a pistol. The band starred in variety shows, such as The Colgate Comedy Hour (1951, 1955) and their All Star Revue (1952) before being given his own slot by NBC, The Spike Jones Show, which aired early in 1954, and Club Oasis on NBC, in the summer of 1958; and by CBS, as The Spike Jones Show, in the summers of 1957, 1960, and 1961. Jones and his City Slickers also appeared on NBC's The Ford Show, Starring Tennessee Ernie Ford in the episode which aired on November 15, 1956. In 1990, BBC2 screened six compilation shows from these broadcasts; they were subsequently aired on PBS stations.

== Later years ==
The virtual disappearance of big bands immediately following the end of World War II and the rise of rock and roll in the early 1950s had a marked effect on Spike Jones's repertoire. Early rock songs were already novelties, and Jones could not spoof them the same way he had lampooned "Cocktails for Two", "Laura" or "Chloe". He played rock music for laughs when he presented "for the first time on television, the bottom half of Elvis Presley!" This was the cue for a pair of pants—inhabited by dwarf actor Billy Barty—to scamper across the stage.

Jones was always prepared to adapt to changing tastes. In 1950, when America was nostalgically looking back at the 1920s, he recorded a tongue-in-cheek album of Charleston arrangements. Over the years, Jones had become increasingly unhappy at RCA Victor; among other matters, the management censored some of his recordings, began interfering in repertoire and pushed him to make more children's records, which led to Jones's departure from the label in 1955. His later recordings were issued by Verve, Liberty and Warner Bros. In 1956, Jones supervised an album of Christmas songs, many of which were straight performances. In 1957, noting the television success of Lawrence Welk and his dance band, he revamped his own act for television. Gone was the old City Slickers mayhem, replaced by a more straightforward big-band sound, with tongue-in-cheek comic moments. The new band was known as Spike Jones and the Band that Plays for Fun. The last record credited to the City Slickers was the LP Dinner Music for People Who Aren't Very Hungry, issued by Verve in 1956. By the late 1950s spoken-word comedy (Bob Newhart, Mort Sahl, Stan Freberg, Shelley Berman) was the current trend in comedy records. Spike Jones adapted to this, too; most of his later albums are spoken-word comedy, including the horror-genre sendup Spike Jones in Stereo (1959) and the send-up of television programs of the period in Omnibust (1960). Jones remained topical to the last: his final group, Spike Jones's New Band, recorded four LPs of brassy renditions of pop-folk tunes of the 1960s (including "Washington Square" and "The Ballad of Jed Clampett"). A notable New Band track from 1964 was a quodlibet arrangement, combining "Dominique", a recent hit by The Singing Nun, with "When the Saints Go Marching In".

== Personal life ==
Jones had four children: Linda (by his first wife, Patricia), Spike Jr., Leslie Ann, and Gina, with Helen Grayco. Spike Jr. is a producer of live events and television broadcasts. Leslie Ann is the Director of Music and Film Scoring at George Lucas' Skywalker Ranch in Marin County.

Jones was a lifelong heavy smoker, reportedly 4-5 packs a day, and eventually he developed breathing problems, including emphysema. He was never the picture of health; his emphysema advanced to the point where he used an oxygen tank both on and offstage, and he was confined to a seat behind his drum set while performing. In spite of his illness, he continued smoking until his death on May 1, 1965, at the age of 53. He is interred in Holy Cross Cemetery, Culver City, California.

His second wife, Helen Grayco, died as a result of cancer in Los Angeles on August 20, 2022, at the age of 97.

== Influence and legacy ==
There is a clear line of influence from Harry Reser's 1920s hot-comic "Six Jumping Jacks" band (whose drummer and vocalist was the distinctive Tom Stacks, "The Voice With a Smile"), the Hoosier Hot Shots, Freddie Fisher and his Schnickelfritzers, and the Marx Brothers to Spike Jones—and to Stan Freberg, Gerard Hoffnung, Peter Schickele's P.D.Q. Bach, The Goons, Joe Raposo, Mr. Bungle, Frank Zappa, George Maciunas, The Bonzo Dog Doo-Dah Band, The Mystic Knights of the Oingo Boingo, and "Weird Al" Yankovic. According to David Wild's review in Rolling Stone, Elvis Costello's 1989 album Spike was named partly in tribute to Jones.

Syndicated radio personality Dr. Demento regularly features Jones's records on his program of comedy and novelty tracks. Jones is mentioned in The Band's song, "Up on Cripple Creek". (The song's protagonist's paramour states of Jones: "I can't take the way he sings, but I love to hear him talk.") Novelist Thomas Pynchon is an admirer and wrote the liner notes for a 1994 CD reissue, Spiked! (BMG Catalyst). A scene in the romantic comedy I.Q. shows a man demonstrating the sound of his new stereo to Meg Ryan's character by playing a Jones recording.

In the 1948 Warner Bros. Merrie Melodies animated short Back Alley Oproar, a caterwauling Sylvester the Cat does a Spike Jones-inspired solo finale cover of "Angel in Disguise" by opening with a brief, serious-sounding introduction before immediately breaking into a jazzy rendition featuring a collection of crazy sound effects produced by firing guns, breaking bottles and exploding firecrackers among other sounds, to Elmer Fudd's annoyance.

Spike Jones is referenced several times in the American TV series M*A*S*H. In season 2, episode 5, "Dr. Pierce and Mr. Hyde", an exhausted Hawkeye sings a line of "Der Fuehrer's Face" in reference to the great songs that came out of World War II; in the season 8 episode ""Good-Bye, Radar: Part 1", when Radar returns from leave in Tokyo to a generator-less 4077th, he calls up Sparky to unsuccessfully bargain for a new one with a variety of items, which included some Spike Jones records; and in the season 11 episode "Foreign Affairs", visiting French Red Cross nurse Martine LeClerc (Melinda Mullins), who develops a warm if brief affair with Charles Emerson Winchester III, tells him that she's a huge fan of Spike Jones, which inspires him to admit, in a rare confession, secretly loving Tom and Jerry cartoons.

In 1974, Tony Levin (future bass player for King Crimson), recording under the name, The Clams, released a Spike Jones tribute of him giving the songs "Close to You" by The Carpenters and "The First Time Ever I Saw Your Face" by Roberta Flack, the Jones treatment.

In 1986, the Belgian synthpop group Telex paid homage to Spike Jones in their album Looney Tunes, with a song named after him. The intro of that song is a part of the intro from "Camptown Races".

In 1997, singers Artie Schroeck and Linda November directed a production in Atlantic City titled "The New City Slickers Present a Tribute to Spike Jones", with a band that attempted to re-create the style and humor of Jones's music.

Both Spike Milligan and Spike Jonze were nick-named in reference to Jones.

== Discography ==
- Spike Jones Plays the Charleston (1950)
- Bottoms Up, Polka (1952)
- Spike Jones Murders Carmen and Kids the Classics (1953)
- Dinner Music For People Who Aren't Very Hungry (1956)
- Spike Jones Presents a Xmas Spectacular (1956) (reissued as It's a Spike Jones Christmas and Let's Sing a Song of Christmas)
- Hi Fi Polka Party (1957)
- Spike Jones in Stereo (1959) (reissued as Spike Jones in Hi Fi)
- Omnibust (1960)
- 60 Years of "Music America Hates Best" (1960)
- Thank You Music Lovers! (1960) (reissued as The Best of Spike Jones in 1967 and 1975)
- Rides, Rapes and Rescues (1960)
- Washington Square (1963)
- Spike Jones New Band (1964)
- My Man (1964)
- The New Band of Spike Jones Plays Hank Williams Hits (1965)
- Spike Jones Is Murdering the Classics (1971)
- The Best of Spike Jones Volume 2 (1977)
- Spike Jones and His Other Orchestra, 1946 (Hindsight Records HUK185 1982)
- Never Trust a city Slicker: Standard Transcription Discs 1942–1944 (Harlequin HQ2042 1986)

=== Select singles ===
| Year | Title | Chart positions |
| Year | Title | US |
|---|---|---|
| 1942 | "Clink, Clink, Another Drink" | 23 |
| 1942 | "Der Fuehrer's Face" | 3 |
| 1944 | "Behind Those Swinging Doors" | 20 |
| 1945 | "Cocktails for Two" | 4 |
| 1945 | "Leave the Dishes in the Sink, Ma" | 14 |
| 1945 | "Chloe" | 5 |
| 1945 | "Holiday for Strings" | 10 |
| 1946 | "Hawaiian War Chant (Ta-Hu-Wa-Hu-Wai)" | 8 |
| 1948 | "William Tell Overture" | 6 |
| 1948 | "All I Want for Christmas Is My Two Front Teeth" | 1 |
| 1949 | "Ya Wanna Buy a Bunny?" | 24 |
| 1949 | "Dance of the Hours" | 13 |
| 1950 | "Chinese Mule Train" | 13 |
| 1950 | "Rudolph the Red-Nosed Reindeer" | 7 |
| 1951 | "Tennessee Waltz" | 13 |
| 1951 | "Rudolph the Red-Nosed Reindeer" | 22 |
| 1952 | "I Saw Mommy Kissing Santa Claus" | 4 |
| 1953 | "I Went to Your Wedding" | 20 |

== Other sources ==
- Gamble, Peter. Clink Clink Another Drink (Media notes). Audio Book & Music Company. ABMMCD 1158.
