= 1935 in music =

This is a list of notable events in music that took place in the year 1935.

== Specific locations ==
- 1935 in British music
- 1935 in Norwegian music

== Specific genres ==
- 1935 in country music
- 1935 in jazz

== Events ==
- February 26 – Georges Bizet's Symphony in C (1855) is performed for the first time, under Felix Weingartner, in Basel, Switzerland.
- April 8 – Béla Bartók's String Quartet No. 5 is premièred in Washington, D.C.
- April 23 – Your Hit Parade is broadcast for the first time on radio.
- June 14 – Three X Sisters "2000 requests for the number (The Three Little Pigs Are Porkchops Now), over W1XBS (radio), Waterburians went into a spin. Many from this city." Song also performed June 3, on WJZ (CBS) by the trio, guest appearance on the popular radio program 'One Night Stand.'
- June 27 --John Serry appears onstage at the Radio City Music Hall under the direction of Ernö Rapée in "The Magazine Rack" revue as choreographed by Russell Markert, founder of The Rockettes.
- July 15 – Alban Berg finishes his Violin Concerto.
- December 1 – Sergei Prokofiev's Violin Concerto No. 2 is premièred in Madrid
- date unknown
  - Soprano Bidu Sayão marries baritone Giuseppe Danise.
  - Swing music achieves popularity.
  - Frank Sinatra begins his professional singing career as a member of the Hoboken Four.
  - Natalino Otto makes his debut on US radio.
  - Brussels Philharmonic is founded as Groot Symfonie-Orkest within Dutch-language public broadcaster NRI/INR.
  - John Serry Sr. begins regular appearances at the Rainbow Room in Rockefeller Plaza, New York City.

== Published popular music ==
- "About a Quarter to Nine" words: Al Dubin music: Harry Warren. Introduced by Al Jolson in the film Go into Your Dance
- "According to the Moonlight" w. Jack Yellen & Herb Magidson m. Joseph Meyer
- "Alone" w. Arthur Freed m. Nacio Herb Brown. Introduced by Allan Jones and Kitty Carlisle in the film A Night at the Opera
- "Animal Crackers in My Soup" w. Ted Koehler & Irving Caesar m. Ray Henderson. Introduced by Shirley Temple in the film Curly Top
- "A Beautiful Lady in Blue" w. Sam M. Lewis m. J. Fred Coots
- "Begin the Beguine" w.m. Cole Porter
- "Bess Oh Where Is My Bess" George Gershwin, Ira Gershwin, DuBose Heyward
- "Bess, You Is My Woman Now" w. DuBose Heyward & Ira Gershwin m. George Gershwin
- "The Blues Jumped A Rabbit" w.m. Jimmie Noone
- "Broadway Rhythm" w. Arthur Freed m. Nacio Herb Brown
- "The Broken Record" w.m. Cliff Friend, Charles Tobias & Boyd Bunch
- "But Where Are You?" w.m. Irving Berlin
- "The Buzzard" m. Bud Freeman
- "Buzzard Song" w. DuBose Heyward m. George Gershwin
- "Casino De Paree" w. Al Dubin m. Harry Warren. Introduced by Al Jolson in the film Go into Your Dance
- "Cheek to Cheek" w.m. Irving Berlin. Introduced by Fred Astaire in the film Top Hat
- "Christopher Robin is Saying His Prayers" w.m. A. A. Milne & Harold Fraser-Simson
- "Cidade Maravilhosa" by André Filho
- "Clouds" w. Gus Kahn m. Walter Donaldson
- "Cosi Cosa" w. Ned Washington m. Bronislaw Kaper & Walter Jurmann
- "Curly Top" w. Ted Koehler m. Ray Henderson. Introduced by John Boles in the film Curly Top
- "Darling, Je Vous Aime Beaucoup" w.m. Anna Sosenko
- "Dese Dem Dose" m. Glenn Miller
- "The Dixieland Band" m. Johnny Mercer m. Bernard Hanighen
- "Don't Give Up The Ship" w. Al Dubin m. Harry Warren
- "Don't Mention Love To Me" Oscar Levant & Dorothy Fields
- "Down By The River" w. Lorenz Hart m. Richard Rodgers
- "Dust Off That Old Pianna" w.m. Irving Caesar, Sammy Lerner & Gerald Marks
- "East of the Sun (and West of the Moon)" w.m. Brooks Bowman
- "Eeny, Meeny, Miney, Mo" w.m. Johnny Mercer & Matt Malneck
- "Every Little Moment" w. Dorothy Fields m.Jimmy McHugh
- "Every Now and Then" w.m. Al Sherman, Abner Silver and Al Lewis.
- "Everything's Been Done Before" w.m. Harold Adamson, Jack King & Edwin H. Knopf
- "Everything's In Rhythm With My Heart" w.m. Al Goodhart, Al Hoffman & Maurice Sigler
- "Fanlight Fanny" George Formby, Harry Gifford and Frederick E. Cliffe
- "From The Top Of Your Head" w. Mack Gordon m. Harry Revel
- "Got A Bran' New Suit" w. Howard Dietz m. Arthur Schwartz
- "Harlem Chapel Chimes" m. Glenn Miller
- "(Lookie, Lookie, Lookie) Here Comes Cookie" w.m. Mack Gordon
- "Honky Tonk Train" m. Meade Lux Lewis
- "Hooray For Love" w. Dorothy Fields m. Jimmy McHugh. Introduced by Gene Raymond in the film Hooray for Love
- "I Built a Dream One Day" w. Oscar Hammerstein II m. Sigmund Romberg. Introduced by Walter Slezak, Walter Woolf King and Robert C. Fischer in the musical May Wine.
- "I Can't Get Started" w. Ira Gershwin m. Vernon Duke
- "I Dream Too Much (Alone)" w. Dorothy Fields m. Jerome Kern
- "I Feel A Song Coming On" w. Dorothy Fields & George Oppenheimer m. Jimmy McHugh
- "I Feel Like A Feather In The Breeze" w. Mack Gordon m. Harry Revel
- "I Got Plenty o' Nuttin'" w. Ira Gershwin & DuBose Heyward m. George Gershwin
- "I Loves You, Porgy" w. DuBose Heyward & Ira Gershwin m. George Gershwin
- "I Wished on the Moon" w. Dorothy Parker m. Ralph Rainger
- "I Won't Dance" w. Dorothy Fields & Jimmy McHugh m. Jerome Kern
- "I'd Love To Take Orders From You" w. Al Dubin m. Harry Warren
- "I'd Rather Lead A Band" w.m. Irving Berlin. Introduced by Fred Astaire in the film Follow the Fleet
- "I'll Never Say "Never Again" Again" w.m. Harry M. Woods
- "I'm Building Up To An Awful Letdown" w. Johnny Mercer m. Fred Astaire
- "I'm Gonna Sit Right Down and Write Myself a Letter" w. Joe Young m. Fred E. Ahlert
- "I'm in the Mood for Love" w. Dorothy Fields m. Jimmy McHugh. Introduced by Frances Langford in the film Every Night at Eight.
- "I'm Living In A Great Big Way" w. Dorothy Fields m. Jimmy McHugh. Introduced by Bill Robinson and Jeni Le Gon in the film Hooray for Love.
- "I'm Shooting High" w. Ted Koehler m. Jimmy McHugh
- "I'm Sitting High On A Hilltop" w. Gus Kahn m. Arthur Johnston
- "I'm Wearin' My Green Fedora" Al Sherman, Al Lewis, Joseph Meyer.
- "In A Little Gypsy Tea Room" w. Edgar Leslie m. Joe Burke
- "In a Sentimental Mood" w. Manny Kurtz & Irving Mills m. Duke Ellington
- "Isn't This a Lovely Day?" w.m. Irving Berlin. Introduced by Fred Astaire in the film Top Hat
- "It Ain't Necessarily So" w. Ira Gershwin m. George Gershwin
- "It's An Old Southern Custom" w. Jack Yellen m. Joseph Meyer
- "It's Easy to Remember" w. Lorenz Hart m. Richard Rodgers
- "I've Got My Fingers Crossed" w. Ted Koehler m. Jimmy McHugh
- "Just One of Those Things" w.m. Cole Porter
- "The Lady In Red" w. Mort Dixon m. Allie Wrubel. Introduced in the film In Caliente by Wini Shaw, Edward Everett Horton, George Humbert and Judy Canova.
- "Last Night When We Were Young" w. E. Y. Harburg m. Harold Arlen
- "Lights Out" by Billy Hill
- "A Little Bit Independent" w. Edgar Leslie m. Joe Burke
- "Little Girl Blue" w. Lorenz Hart m. Richard Rodgers. Introduced by Gloria Grafton in the musical Billy Rose's Jumbo.
- "Love Me Forever" by Gus Kahn
- "Lovely to Look at" w. Dorothy Fields & Jimmy McHugh m. Jerome Kern
- "Lullaby of Broadway" w. Al Dubin m. Harry Warren
- "Lulu's Back In Town" w. Al Dubin m. Harry Warren. Introduced by Dick Powell and The Mills Brothers in the film Broadway Gondolier.
- "Maybe" w.m. Allan Flynn & Frank Madden
- "Men About Town" w.m. Noël Coward
- "Miss Brown To You" w. Leo Robin m. Ralph Rainger & Richard A. Whiting
- "Moon Over Miami" w. Edgar Leslie m. Joe Burke
- "Moonburn" w. Edward Heyman m. Hoagy Carmichael
- "The Most Beautiful Girl in the World" w. Lorenz Hart m. Richard Rodgers. Introduced by Donald Novis and Gloria Grafton in the musical Jumbo.
- "Mrs Worthington" w.m. Noël Coward
- "The Music Goes 'Round and Around" w. "Red" Hodgson m. Edward Farley & Michael Riley
- "My Heart And I" w. Leo Robin m. Frederick Hollander
- "My Man's Gone Now" w. DuBose Heyward m. George Gershwin
- "My Romance" w. Lorenz Hart m. Richard Rodgers
- "My Very Good Friend The Milkman" w. Johnny Burke m. Harold Spina
- "Noche de ronda", by Agustin Lara
- "No Strings (I'm Fancy Free)" w.m. Irving Berlin. Introduced by Fred Astaire in the film Top Hat
- "On the Beach at Bali-Bali" w.m. Al Sherman, Abner Silver, Jack Meskill
- "On Treasure Island" w. Edgar Leslie m. Joe Burke, Myers, Wendling
- "Paris in the Spring" w. Mack Gordon m. Harry Revel. Introduced by Mary Ellis in the film Paris in Spring
- "The Piccolino" by Irving Berlin. Introduced by Ginger Rogers in the film Top Hat
- "A Picture Of Me Without You" w.m. Cole Porter. Introduced by June Knight and Charles Walters in the musical Jubilee
- "Red Sails in the Sunset" w. Jimmy Kennedy m. Will Grosz
- "Roll Along, Prairie Moon" w.m. Albert Von Tilzer, Harry McPherson & Ted Fiorito
- "The Rose In Her Hair" w. Al Dubin m. Harry Warren. Introduced by Dick Powell in the film Broadway Gondolier.
- "Say "Si Si"" w. (Eng) Al Stillman (Sp) Francia Luban m. Ernesto Lecuona
- "Shadow Play" w.m. Noël Coward
- "She's A Latin From Manhattan" w. Al Dubin m. Harry Warren. Introduced by Al Jolson in the film Go into Your Dance
- "Shoe Shine Boy" w. Sammy Cahn m. Saul Chaplin
- "So Long, It's Been Good To Know You" w.m. Woody Guthrie
- "Solo Hop" m. Glenn Miller
- "Soon (Maybe Not Tomorrow)" w. Lorenz Hart m. Richard Rodgers
- "Summertime" w. DuBose Heyward m. George Gershwin
- "Take Me Back To My Boots And Saddle" w.m. Walter G, Samuels, Leonard Whitcup, & Teddy Powell
- "Thanks a Million" w. Gus Kahn m. Arthur Johnston. Introduced by Dick Powell in the film Thanks a Million.
- "There's A Boat Dat's Leavin' Soon For New York" w. Ira Gershwin m. George Gershwin
- "There's No One With Endurance Like The Man Who Sells Insurance" Frank Crumit, Curtis
- "These Foolish Things" w. Holt Marvell m. Jack Strachey & Harry Link
- "This Time It's Love" by Sam M. Lewis
- "Tic-tac do Meu Coração" by Alcyr Pires Red and Walfrido Silva
- "Tomorrow's Another Day" w.m. Glenn Miller
- "Top Hat, White Tie and Tails" w.m. Irving Berlin. Introduced by Fred Astaire in the film Top Hat
- "Trois Fables de Lafontaine" w.m. Marcelle de Manziarly
- "When Icky Morgan Plays the Organ" w.m. Glenn Miller
- "When Somebody Thinks You're Wonderful" Harry M. Woods
- "Who's Been Polishing The Sun" w.m. Noel Gay
- "Why Shouldn't I?" w.m. Cole Porter. Introduced by Margaret Adams in the musical Jubilee.
- "Why Stars Come Out At Night" w.m. Ray Noble
- "With All My Heart" w. Gus Kahn m. Jimmy McHugh. Introduced by Peggy Conklin in the 1936 film Her Master's Voice
- "A Woman Is A Sometime Thing" w. DuBose Heyward m. George Gershwin
- "You Are My Lucky Star" w. Arthur Freed m. Nacio Herb Brown
- "You Hit the Spot" w. Mack Gordon m. Harry Revel. Performed by Frances Langford in the 1936 musical film Collegiate.
- "You Let Me Down" w. Al Dubin m. Harry Warren. Introduced by Jane Froman in the film Stars over Broadway
- "You're an Angel" by Jimmy McHugh
- "You're an Eyeful of Heaven" w. Mort Dixon m. Allie Wrubel. Introduced by Patricia Ellis in the film Bright Lights.
- "You're The Only Star (In My Blue Heaven)" w.m. Gene Autry

== Top popular recordings 1935 ==
The top popular records of 1935 listed below were compiled from Joel Whitburn's Pop Memories 1890–1954, record sales reported on the "Discography of American Historical Recordings" website, and other sources as specified. Numerical rankings are approximate, there were no Billboard charts in 1935, the numbers are only used for a frame of reference.

Rank	Artist	Title	Label	Recorded	Released	Chart positions
1	Fred Astaire	"Cheek to Cheek"	Brunswick 7486	June 26, 1935	August 1935	US Billboard 1935 #1, US #1 for 11 weeks, 18 total weeks, Grammy Hall of Fame 2000
2	Ray Noble and His Orchestra (Vocal Al Bowlly)	"Isle Of Capri"	Victor 24771	August 30, 1934	November 14, 1934	US Billboard 1935 #2, US #1 for 7 weeks, 16 total weeks
3	Glen Gray and His Orchestra	"When I Grow Too Old to Dream"	Decca 349	January 9, 1935	February 1935	US Billboard 1935 #3, US #1 for 4 weeks, 23 total weeks
4	Guy Lombardo and His Royal Canadians	"Red Sails in the Sunset"	Decca 585	October 11, 1935	October 1935	US Billboard 1935 #4, US #1 for 4 weeks, 16 total weeks
5	Eddy Duchin and His Orchestra and His Orchestra	"Lovely to Look At"	Victor 24871	November 9, 1935	November 24, 1935	US Billboard 1935 #5, US #1 for 7 weeks, 12 total weeks
6	Victor Young and His Orchestra	"She's a Latin from Manhattan"	Decca 418	March 21, 1935	April 1935	US Billboard 1935 #6, US #1 for 7 weeks, 12 total weeks
7	Eddy Duchin and His Orchestra	"I Won't Dance"	Victor 24871	February 15, 1935	April 1935	US Billboard 1935 #7, US #1 for 3 weeks, 14 total weeks
8	Little Jack Little	"I'm in the Mood for Love"	Columbia 3069-D	June 28, 1935	August 1935	US Billboard 1935 #8, US #1 for 3 weeks, 14 total weeks
9	Bob Crosby and His Orchestra	"In a Little Gypsy Tea Room"	Decca 478	June 1, 1935	July 1935	US Billboard 1935 #9, US #1 for 3 weeks, 13 total weeks
10	Fats Waller	"Truckin'"	Victor 25116	August 2, 1935	October 1935	US Billboard 1935 #10, US #1 for 3 weeks, 13 total weeks
11	The Dorsey Brothers	"Chasing Shadows"	Decca 476	May 7, 1935	July 1935	US Billboard 1935 #11, US #1 for 3 weeks, 9 total weeks
12	Eddy Duchin and His Orchestra	"You Are My Lucky Star"	Victor 25125	July 5, 1935	September 4, 1935	US Billboard 1935 #12, US #1 for 3 weeks, 9 total weeks
13	Glen Gray and His Orchestra	"Blue Moon"	Decca 312	November 16, 1934	December 1934	US Billboard 1935 #13, US #1 for 3 weeks, 8 total weeks, Jazz Standards 1934
14	Tom Coakley and His Palace Hotel Orchestra	"East of the Sun (and West of the Moon)"	Victor 25069	May 28, 1935	June 26, 1935	US Billboard 1935 #14, US #1 for 2 weeks, 15 total weeks
15	Guy Lombardo and His Royal Canadians	"What's the Reason (I'm Not Pleasin' You)"	Decca 393	November 9, 1935	March 1935	US Billboard 1935 #15, US #1 for 2 weeks, 15 total weeks
16	Ruth Etting	"Life Is a Song"	Columbia 3031-D	April 5, 1935	June 1935	US Billboard 1935 #16, US #1 for 2 weeks, 12 total weeks
17	Dorsey Brothers' Orchestra	"Lullaby of Broadway"	Decca 370	January 26, 1935	March 1935	US Billboard 1935 #17, US #1 for 2 weeks, 11 total weeks
18	The Boswell Sisters	"The Object Of My Affection"	Brunswick 7348	December 10, 1934	January 1935	US Billboard 1935 #18, US #1 for 2 weeks, 10 total weeks
19	Bing Crosby	"It's Easy to Remember"	Decca 391	February 21, 1935	April 1935	US Billboard 1935 #19, US #1 for 2 weeks, 9 total weeks
20	Bing Crosby	"Red Sails in the Sunset"	Decca 616	November 12, 1935	November 1935	US Billboard 1935 #20, US #1 for 2 weeks, 7 total weeks

=== Christmas songs ===
- "När ljusen tändas därhemma" – translated into Swedish by Nils Hellström
- "Santa Claus Is Comin' to Town" by J. Fred Coots and Haven Gillespie
- "Jingle Bells" by Benny Goodman & His Orchestra
- "Silent Night" by Bing Crosby

== Classical music ==
=== Premieres ===
Composer	Composition	Date	Location	Performers
Badings, Henk	Symphony No. 3	1935-05-02	Amsterdam	Concertgebouw Orchestra – Mengelberg
Bartók, Béla	String Quartet No. 5	1935-04-08	Washington D.C.	Kolisch Quartet
Casella, Alfredo	Introduzione, Corale e Marcia	1935-12-11	Winterthur, Switzerland	Musikkollegium Orchestra – Scherchen
Hartmann, Karl Amadeus	Miserae	1935-09-02	Prague (ISCM)	[unknown ensemble] – Scherchen
Hindemith, Paul	Der Schwanendreher	1935-11-14	Amsterdam	Hindemith / Concertgebouw Orchestra – Mengelberg
Ibert, Jacques	Concertino da camera	1935-12-11	Winterthur, Switzerland	Rascher / Musikkollegium Orchestra – Scherchen
Messiaen, Olivier	L'ascension	1935-02-09	Paris, France	Concerts Siohan Orchestra – Siohan
Milhaud, Darius	Cello Concerto No. 1	1935-06-28	Paris, France	Maréchal / [unknown orchestra] – Inghelbrecht
Milhaud, Darius	Concertino de printemps	1935-03-21	Paris, France	Astruc / [unknown ensemble] – Milhaud
Prokofiev, Sergei	Violin Concerto No. 2	1935-12-01	Madrid	Soetens / Madrid Symphony – Fernández Arbós
Stravinsky, Igor	Concerto for Two Pianos	1935-11-21	Paris, France	I. Stravinsky, S. Stravinsky
Tippett, Michael	String Quartet No. 1	1935-12-09	London, UK	Brosa Quartet
Van Nuffel, Jules	Laetatus sum	1935-07	Mechelen, Belgium	St. Rumbold's Cathedral Choir & organ
Villa-Lobos, Heitor	Uirapuru	1935-05-25	Buenos Aires	Teatro Colón orchestra & corps de ballet – Villa-Lobos
Walton, William	Symphony No. 1	1935-11-06	London, UK	BBC Symphony – Harty
Webern, Anton	Concerto for Nine Instruments	1935-09-04	Prague (ISCM)	[unknown ensemble] – Jalowetz

=== Compositions ===
- Alban Berg – Violin Concerto
- Aaron Copland – Statements for Orchestra
- Ernst von Dohnányi – Sextet for piano, violin, viola, cello, clarinet and horn, Op. 37
- Sir George Dyson – Belshazzar's Feast
- Hanns Eisler – Lenin Requiem
- George Enescu
  - Cello Sonata No. 2 in C major, Op. 26, No. 2
  - Piano Sonata No. 3 in D major, Op. 24, No. 3
- Rudolf Escher – Piano Sonata No. 1
- Pierre-Octave Ferroud – Sonnerie pour le Hérault
- Vittorio Giannini – Piano Concerto
- Paul Hindemith – Der Schwanendreher for Viola and Orchestra
- André Hossein – Towards the Light (ballet)
- Akira Ifukube – Japanese Rhapsody
- Uuno Klami – Psalmus (oratorio)
- Hans Pfitzner – Cello Concerto No. 1 in G Major
- Francis Poulenc – Suite française
- Sergei Prokofiev – Violin Concerto No. 2 in G Minor, Op. 63
- Roger Sessions – Violin Concerto
- Petar Stojanović – Sava (symphonic poem)
- William Walton – Symphony No. 1

== Opera ==
- Brian Easdale – The Corn King
- Reynaldo Hahn – Le marchand de Venise
- Karl Amadeus Hartmann – Simplicius Simplicissimus Jugend (composed between 1934 and 1936; performance of Hartmann's works banned by the Nazis after 1933)
- Arthur Honegger – Jeanne d'Arc au bûcher (dramatic oratorio)
- Pietro Mascagni – Nerone
- Alexander Zemlinsky – Der König Kandaules (first performance 1996)

== Film ==
- Benjamin Britten – Coal Face
- Benjamin Britten – Men Behind the Meters
- Aram Khachaturian – Pepo (film)
- Erich Korngold – Captain Blood (1935 film)
- Franz Waxman – Bride of Frankenstein

== Musical theatre ==
- Anything Goes London production opened at the Palace Theatre on June 14 and ran for 261 performances
- The Gay Deceivers London production opened at the Coliseum on September 7 and ran for 123 performances
- Glamorous Night (w. Christopher Hassall m. Ivor Novello) – London production opened at the Theatre Royal on May 2 and ran for 243 performances
- Jubilee Broadway production opened at the Imperial Theatre on October 12 and ran for 169 performances.
- Jumbo Broadway production opened at the Hippodrome on November 16 and ran for 233 performances.
- May Wine Broadway production opened at the St. James Theatre on December 5 and ran for 213 performances.
- Porgy and Bess (George Gershwin) – Broadway production opened at the Alvin Theatre on October 10 and ran for 124 performances
- Rivals! London production opened at the Kingsway Theatre and ran on October 23 for 86 performances
- Stop Press London production opened at the Adelphi Theatre on February 21.

== Musical films ==
- Antonia, starring Marcelle Chantal, Fernand Gravey and Josette Day, with music by Paul Abraham and Alfred Rode
- Be Careful, Mr Smith starring Bobbie Comber
- The Bird Seller (Der Vogelhändler), starring Maria Andergast, Wolf Albach-Retty and Lil Dagover, based on the operetta by Carl Zeller.
- Bright Lights starring Joe E. Brown, Ann Dvorak and Patricia Ellis. Directed by Busby Berkeley.
- Broadway Gondolier released July 27 starring Dick Powell and Joan Blondell, and featuring The Mills Brothers and Ted Fio Rito & his Band.
- Broadway Melody of 1936 starring Jack Benny, Eleanor Powell, Una Merkel and Robert Taylor and featuring Frances Langford
- Casta diva, starring Mártha Eggerth, with music by Vincenzo Bellini
- Curly Top released August 2 starring Shirley Temple
- Dizzy Dames starring Marjorie Rambeau, Inez Courtney, Fuzzy Knight and Kitty Kelly
- El caballo del pueblo, starring Irma Córdoba
- El día que me quieras, starring Carlos Gardel, Rosita Moreno and Tito Lusiardo, with music by Gardel and lyrics by Alfredo Le Pera
- Estudantes, starring Carmen Miranda, Mesquitinha and Mário Reis, with music by João de Barro, Alberto Ribeiro and others
- Every Night at Eight starring Alice Faye, Frances Langford and Patsy Kelly
- First a Girl starring Jessie Matthews and Sonnie Hale
- George White's 1935 Scandals starring Alice Faye, Cliff Edwards and Eleanor Powell
- Go into Your Dance released April 20 starring Al Jolson and Ruby Keeler
- Heart's Desire starring Richard Tauber
- Hooray for Love starring Ann Sothern, Gene Raymond and Pert Kelton, and featuring Bill Robinson and Fats Waller
- In Caliente starring Dolores del Río, Pat O'Brien, Leo Carrillo and Edward Everett Horton and featuring Wini Shaw
- Invitation to the Waltz, starring Lilian Harvey
- King Solomon of Broadway starring Edmund Lowe, Dorothy Page and Pinky Tomlin
- Königswalzer, starring Paul Hörbiger, Curd Jürgens and Carola Höhn
- Naughty Marietta starring Jeanette MacDonald, Nelson Eddy and Elsa Lanchester
- The Night Is Young starring Ramon Novarro, Evelyn Laye, Charles Butterworth, Una Merkel and Edward Everett Horton
- Paddy O'Day starring Jane Withers, Pinky Tomlin and Rita Hayworth
- Princesse Tam Tam, starring Josephine Baker and Albert Préjean
- Reckless starring Jean Harlow and William Powell and featuring Allan Jones and Nina Mae McKinney.
- Redheads on Parade starring John Boles, Dixie Lee and Jack Haley
- Roberta starring Ginger Rogers, Fred Astaire, Irene Dunne and Randolph Scott.
- She Shall Have Music starring Jack Hylton, June Clyde and Brian Lawrance. Directed by Leslie S. Hiscott.
- Shipmates Forever starring Dick Powell and Ruby Keeler
- Stars Over Broadway (released November 5), starring Jane Froman and James Melton
- Sweet Music starring Rudy Vallée, Ann Dvorak and Helen Morgan
- Thanks a Million starring Dick Powell and Ann Dvorak
- Top Hat starring Fred Astaire and Ginger Rogers
- Two for Tonight starring Bing Crosby, Joan Bennett and Thelma Todd
- Two Hearts in Harmony starring Bernice Claire and George Curzon and featuring Chick Endor, Charles Farrell and Jack Harris & his Orchestra. Directed by William Beaudine.

== Births ==
- January 8 – Elvis Presley, American rock & roll singer (died 1977)
- January 10
  - Sherrill Milnes, American operatic baritone
  - Ronnie Hawkins, American rockabilly singer (died 2022)
- January 16 – Joachim Grubich, Polish concert organist (died 2025)
- January 19 – Johnny O'Keefe, Australian singer-songwriter (died 1978)
- January 20 – Dorothy Provine, American actress, singer and dancer (died 2010)
- January 24 – Gaqo Çako, Albanian opera singer (died 2018)
- February 3 – Johnny "Guitar" Watson, African-American singer-songwriter and musician (died 1996)
- February 5 – Alex Harvey, Scottish rock singer (died 1982)
- February 11
  - Bent Lorentzen, Danish composer (died 2018)
  - Gene Vincent, American rock & roll singer (died 1971)
- February 12 – Gene McDaniels, American singer-songwriter (died 2011)
- February 16 – Sonny Bono, American singer, actor and record producer (died 1998)
- February 18
  - Ciarán Bourke, Irish folk musician (died 1988)
  - Gennady Gladkov, Soviet and Russian composer
- February 27 – Mirella Freni, Italian operatic soprano (died 2020)
- March 17 – Adam Wade, American singer, drummer and actor (died 2022)
- March 20 - Aviva Semadar, Israeli folklore and chanson singer (died 2025)
- March 29 – Ruby Murray, Northern Irish singer (died 1996)
- March 30 – Gordon Mumma, American composer
- March 31 – Herb Alpert, American trumpeter and bandleader
- April 5 – Peter Grant, English manager and record executive (Led Zeppelin) (died 1995)
- April 6 – Fred Bongusto, Italian light music singer=songwriter and composer (died 2019)
- April 7 – Bobby Bare, American singer/songwriter
- April 9 – Aulis Sallinen, Finnish composer
- April 10 – Jerzy Milian, Polish jazz vibraphonist (died 2018)
- April 16 – Bobby Vinton, American singer
- April 19 – Dudley Moore, English composer, jazz pianist and comic actor (died 2002)
- April 22 – Paul Chambers, American jazz bassist (died 1969)
- April 23 – Ray Peterson, American singer (died 2005)
- May 9 – Nokie Edwards, American guitarist and actor (The Ventures) (died 2018)
- May 10 – Larry Williams, American singer-songwriter and pianist (died 1980)
- May 13 – Teddy Randazzo, American singer-songwriter and accordion player (died 2003)
- May 15 – Akihiro Miwa, Japanese singer, actor, director, composer, author and drag queen
- May 27 – Ramsey Lewis, African-American jazz musician and composer (died 2022)
- June 1 – Hazel Dickens, American singer-songwriter and guitarist (died 2011)
- June 17 – Peggy Seeger, American folk singer
- June 24 – Terry Riley, American minimalist composer
- June 26 – Dwight York, American singer (Passion)
- July 1 – James Cotton, African-American harmonica player and singer-songwriter (died 2017)
- July 2 – Gilbert Kalish, American pianist
- July 5 – Shirley Collins, English folk singer
- July 8 – Steve Lawrence, American singer (Steve and Eydie) (died 2024)
- July 9
  - Mercedes Sosa, Argentine singer (died 2009)
  - Mighty Sparrow, Grenadian singer (died 2026
- July 12 – Barry Mason, English songwriter (died 2021)
- July 17
  - Diahann Carroll, American actress and singer (died 2019)
  - Peter Schickele, American composer and classical music parodist (died 2024)
  - Carolyn Smith-Meyer, American operatic soprano (died 2003)
- July 24 – Les Reed, English songwriter and light orchestra leader (died 2019)
- July 29
  - Jacques Levy, American songwriter (died 2004)
  - Morella Muñoz, Venezuelan mezzo-soprano (died 1995)
- August 2 – Hank Cochran, American country music singer/songwriter (died 2010)
- August 10 – Giya Kancheli, Soviet and Georgian composer (died 2019)
- August 15 – Jim Dale, English singer-songwriter and actor
- August 16 – Bobby Mitchell, New Orleans do-wop and R&B singer (died 1986)
- August 18 – Sir Howard Morrison, New Zealand concert singer (died 2009)
- August 21 – Lord Creator, born Kentrick Patrick, Trinidadian calypso singer (died 2023)
- August 30 – John Phillips, American singer, guitarist and songwriter (The Mamas & the Papas) (died 2001)
- September 1 – Seiji Ozawa, Japanese conductor (died 2024)
- September 2 – Vladimír Válek, Czech conductor (died 2025)
- September 7 – Ronnie Dove, American pop and country singer with several chart records throughout the 1960s and '70s
- September 9 – Chaim Topol, Israeli singer and performer (Fiddler on the Roof) (died 2023)
- September 11 – Arvo Pärt, Estonian classical composer
- September 14 – Ángel Medardo Luzuriaga, Ecuadorian musical artist (died 2018)
- September 19 – Nick Massi, American rock bass singer/guitarist (The Four Seasons) (died 2000)
- September 20 – László Aradszky, Hungarian singer (died 2017)
- September 21 – Henry Gibson, American actor and singer-songwriter (died 2009)
- September 22 – Virgilijus Noreika, Lithuanian tenor (died 2018)
- September 29 – Jerry Lee Lewis, American singer-songwriter and pianist (died 2022)
- September 30
  - Z. Z. Hill, American blues singer (died 1984)
  - Johnny Mathis, American singer
- October 1 – Julie Andrews, English singer and actress
- October 2 – Peter Frankl, British pianist
- October 5 – Khayyam Mirzazade, Azerbaijani composer and teacher (died 2018)
- October 12
  - Samuel David Moore, American Southern soul and R&B singer (Sam and Dave)
  - Luciano Pavarotti, Italian operatic tenor (died 2007)
- October 14 – La Monte Young, American composer
- October 15 – Barry McGuire, American singer-songwriter
- October 17 – Michael Eavis, English dairy farmer, founder of the Glastonbury Festival
- October 20 – Jerry Orbach, American musical theatre actor (died 2004)
- October 21 – Derek Bell, Northern Irish harpist and composer (died 2002)
- October 24 – Malcolm Bilson, American pianist
- November 4 – Laila Sari, Indonesian comedian and singer (died 2017)
- November 13 – P. Susheela, Indian playback singer
- November 17
  - Imrat Khan, Imrat sitar player (died 2018)
  - Masatoshi Sakai, Japanese record producer
- November 18 – Alain Barrière, French singer (died 2019)
- November 27 – Al Jackson, Jr., American R&B drummer, producer and songwriter (Booker T. & the M.G.'s) (died 1975)
- November 30 – Usha Mangeshkar, Indian singer
- December 23 – Little Esther Phillips, American R&B singer (died 1984)
- December 26 – Abdul "Duke" Fakir, American soul singer (Four Tops) (died 2024)
- date unknown – Mogens Ellegaard, Danish accordionist (died 1995)

== Deaths ==
- January 8
  - Jesse Garon Presley, stillborn twin of Elvis Presley
  - Rauf Yekta, Turkish musicologist and author (born 1871)
- January 9 – Dina Edling, operatic mezzo-soprano (born 1854)
- January 11 – Marcella Sembrich, coloratura soprano (born 1858)
- January 13 – Heinrich Schenker, music theorist (born 1868)
- January 22 – Zequinha de Abreu, musician and composer (born 1880)
- January 28 – Mikhail Ippolitov-Ivanov, composer (born 1859)
- February – Alice Esty, operatic soprano (born 1864)
- February 2 – Clara Smith, blues singer (born c. 1894)
- February 28 – Chiquinha Gonzaga, composer (born 1847)
- April 2 – Bennie Moten, jazz pianist and bandleader (born 1894)
- April 5 – Emil Młynarski, violinist, conductor and composer (born 1870)
- April 9 – Israel Schorr, cantor (born 1886)
- April 16 – Victor Ewald, composer (born 1860)
- April 23 – Georgina Stirling, operatic soprano (born 1866)
- April 24 – Paul Klengel, pianist, violinist, composer (born 1854)
- April 29 – Leroy Carr, blues musician (born 1905)
- May 3 – Charles Manners, operatic bass (born 1857)
- May 10 – Herbert Witherspoon, operatic bass and opera manager (born 1873)
- May 16 – Leopold Lichtenberg, violinist (born 1861)
- May 17 – Paul Dukas, composer (born 1865)
- May 19 – Charles Martin Loeffler, American composer (born 1861)
- May 28 – Jelka Rosen, wife of Frederick Delius (born 1868)
- May 29 – Josef Suk, composer (born 1874)
- June 6 – Jacques Urlus, operatic tenor (born 1867)
- June 24 – in an air crash in Colombia:
  - Carlos Gardel, tango singer (born 1890)
  - Alfredo Le Pera, lyricist (born 1900)
- July 21 – Honoré Dutrey, jazz trombonist (born c. 1894)
- August 2 – Isidore de Lara, composer (born 1858)
- August 20 – Otakar Ostrčil, composer and conductor (born 1879)
- August 21 – Marjorie White, actress, singer and dancer (born 1904) (in a car crash)
- September 11 – Evelyn Hoey, torch singer (born 1910) (suicide)
- September 20 – Amy Sherwin, operatic soprano (born 1855)
- September 23 – DeWolf Hopper, US actor and singer (born 1858)
- October 4 – Marie Gutheil-Schoder, operatic soprano (born 1874)
- October 6 – Edward Moore, music critic, music journalist, writer on music, songwriter, and composer (born 1877)
- October 13 – Dranem, French singer and music hall entertainer (born 1869)
- October 22 – Komitas, exiled Armenian priest and ethnomusicologist (born 1869)
- November 16 – Kurt Schindler, conductor and composer (born 1882)
- November 18 – Anton Hekking, cellist (born 1856)
- November 27 – Charlie Green, jazz trombonist (born c. 1900)
- November 28 – Erich von Hornbostel, musicologist (born 1877)
- December 4 – Johan Halvorsen, violinist, conductor and composer (born 1864)
- December 9 – Nina Grieg, soprano and wife of Edvard Grieg (born 1845)
- December 12 – Cora S. Briggs, organist and composer (born 1859)
- December 24 – Alban Berg, composer (born 1885)

== Awards ==
- Henryk Wieniawski Violin Competition – Ginette Neveu
