= Ted Straeter =

- Born: Theodore Anthony Straeter; November 21, 1913; St Louis, Missouri, U.S.
- Died: April 2, 1963 (aged 49) Palm Beach, Florida, U.S.
- Genres: Jazz, easy listening
- Occupations: Pianist, singer, bandleader
- Instruments: Vocals, piano
- Years active: 1926–1963
- Labels: Atlantic, Columbia, Capitol

Theodore Anthony Straeter (November 21, 1913 – April 2, 1963) was an American pianist, singer and bandleader.

== Biography ==
Born in St Louis, Missouri, Straeter was a child prodigy as a piano player and made his first tour at the age of 12, billed as "The 12-Year-Old Wonder". He organized and toured with his own band the following year, 1927, and at the age of 14 had his own radio show. After two years formally studying music, he set up his own vocal studio, coaching singers including Benay Venuta, Carol Bruce, and Dorothy Kirsten.

He moved to New York in 1935, and at Irving Berlin's suggestion worked in Tin Pan Alley before becoming the pianist in Billy Rose's stage musical Jumbo. The Rodgers and Hart song "The Most Beautiful Girl in the World", featured in the musical, became Straeter's theme song. Straeter also worked with the Paul Whiteman Orchestra, and became the arranger and musical director for Kate Smith's radio shows.

Praised by orchestral conductor Walter Damrosch, Straeter became a leading performer at society dances in New York after the end of World War II. He had a long residency at the Persian Room in the Plaza Hotel, before moving to the Savoy Hilton. He also performed in clubs in New York, Florida and Los Angeles. He had a successful recording career as both a pianist and singer, with a "whispery" vocal style. His first hit record was "Imagination" (1940), featuring vocals by Dorothy Rochelle, and he had a second chart hit in 1952 with a re-recorded version of "The Most Beautiful Girl in the World".

Leading his Society Dance Orchestra, he also recorded several albums in the 1950s and early 1960s, including Ted Straeter's New York (Atlantic, 1955), Come Dance With Me (Columbia, 1958), The Romantic Piano of Ted Straeter (Columbia, 1958), Ted Straeter Sings to the Most Beautiful Girl in the World (Columbia, 1959), and Dance to the Music from Sail Away (Capitol, 1962).

Straeter died suddenly, following an operation, in Palm Beach, Florida, aged 49.
