= Manziarly =

Manziarly is a surname. Notable people with the surname include:

- Constanze Manziarly (1920–1945), Adolf Hitler's cook
- Marcelle de Manziarly (1899–1989), French pianist, music educator, conductor, and composer
