= Wingy Manone =

American jazz trumpet player (1900–1982)

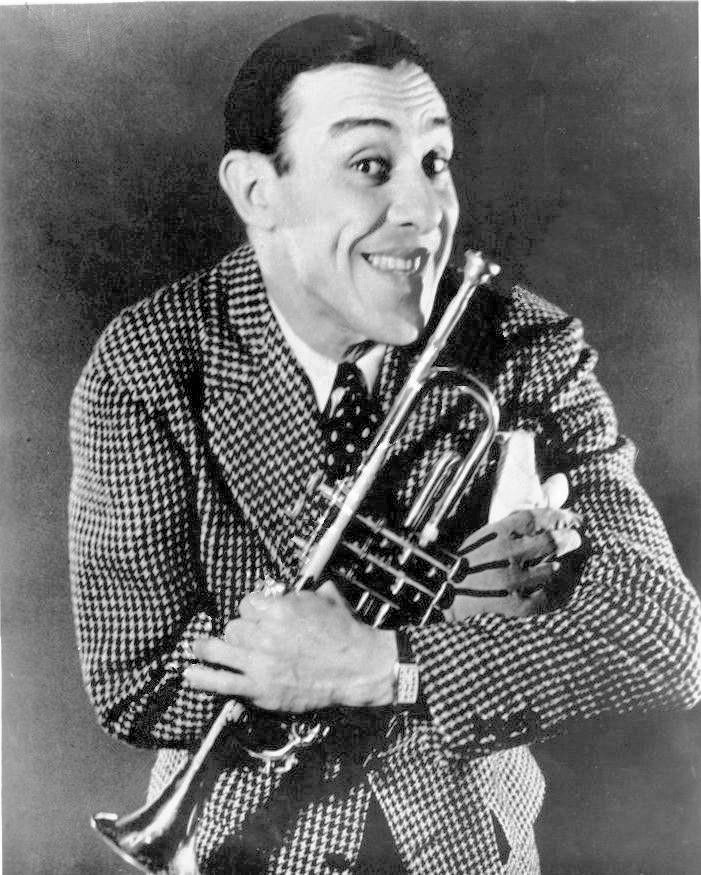

Background information
- Born: Joseph Matthews Manone; February 13, 1900; New Orleans, Louisiana, U.S.
- Died: July 9, 1982 (aged 82) Las Vegas, Nevada, U.S.
- Genres: Jazz
- Occupations: Musician, composer
- Instruments: Trumpet, vocals
- Years active: 1924–1982

Joseph Matthews "Wingy" Manone (February 13, 1900 – July 9, 1982) was an American jazz trumpeter, composer, singer, and bandleader. His recordings included "Tar Paper Stomp", "Nickel in the Slot", "Downright Disgusted Blues", "There'll Come a Time (Wait and See)", and "Tailgate Ramble".

== Biography ==
Manone (pronounced "ma-KNOWN") was born in New Orleans, Louisiana, of Sicilian descent. He lost his right arm in a streetcar accident when he was ten years old, which resulted in his nickname of "Wingy". He used a prosthesis so naturally and unnoticeably that his disability was not apparent to the public.

After playing trumpet and cornet professionally with various bands in his hometown, he began to travel across America in the 1920s, working in Chicago, New York City, Texas, Mobile, Alabama, California, St. Louis, Missouri, and other locations.

Manone's style was similar to that of fellow New Orleans trumpeter Louis Prima: hot jazz with trumpet leads, punctuated by good-natured spoken patter in a pleasantly gravelly voice. Manone was an esteemed musician who was frequently recruited for recording sessions. He played on some early Benny Goodman records, for example and fronted various pickup groups under pseudonyms like "The Cellar Boys" and "Barbecue Joe and His Hot Dogs." His hit records included "Tar Paper Stomp" (an original riff composition of 1929, later used as the basis for Glenn Miller's "In the Mood"), and a hot 1934 version of a sweet ballad of the time "The Isle of Capri", which was said to have annoyed the songwriters despite the royalties it earned them.

Manone's group, like other bands, often recorded alternative versions of songs during the same sessions; Manone's vocals would be used for the American, Canadian, and British releases, and strictly instrumental versions would be intended for the international, non-English-speaking markets. Thus, there is more than one version of many Wingy Manone hits. Among his better records are "There'll Come a Time (Wait and See)" (1934, also known as "San Antonio Stomp"), "Send Me" (1936), and the novelty hit "The Broken Record" (1936). He and his band did regular recording and radio work through the 1930s and appeared with Bing Crosby in the 1940 film Rhythm on the River.

His 1939 recording, "Boogie Woogie", featured the piano of Conrad Lanoue, who was part of Manone's band from 1936 to 1940. In 1943, Manone recorded several tunes as "Wingy Manone and His Cats"; that same year he performed in Soundies movie musicals. One of his Soundies reprised his recent hit, "Rhythm on the River."

Manone's autobiography, Trumpet on the Wing, was published in 1948.

From the 1950s, he was based mostly in California and Las Vegas, Nevada, although he also toured through the United States, Canada, and parts of Europe to appear at jazz festivals. In 1957, he attempted to break into the teenage rock-and-roll market with his version of "Party Doll", the Buddy Knox hit. His version on Decca 30211 made No. 56 on Billboard's Pop chart and it received a UK release on Brunswick 05655.

Manone's compositions include "There'll Come a Time (Wait and See)" with Miff Mole (1928), "Tar Paper Stomp" (1930), "Tailgate Ramble" with Johnny Mercer, "Stop the War (The Cats Are Killin' Themselves)" (1941), "Trying to Stop My Crying", "Downright Disgusted Blues" with Bud Freeman, "Swing Out" with Ben Pollack, "Send Me", "Nickel in the Slot" with Irving Mills, "Jumpy Nerves", "Mannone Blues", "Easy Like", "Strange Blues", "Swingin' at the Hickory House", "No Calling Card", "Where's the Waiter?", "Walkin' the Streets (Till My Baby Comes Home)", and "Fare Thee Well (Annabelle)". In 2008, "There'll Come a Time (Wait and See)" was used in the soundtrack to the Academy Award-nominated movie The Curious Case of Benjamin Button.

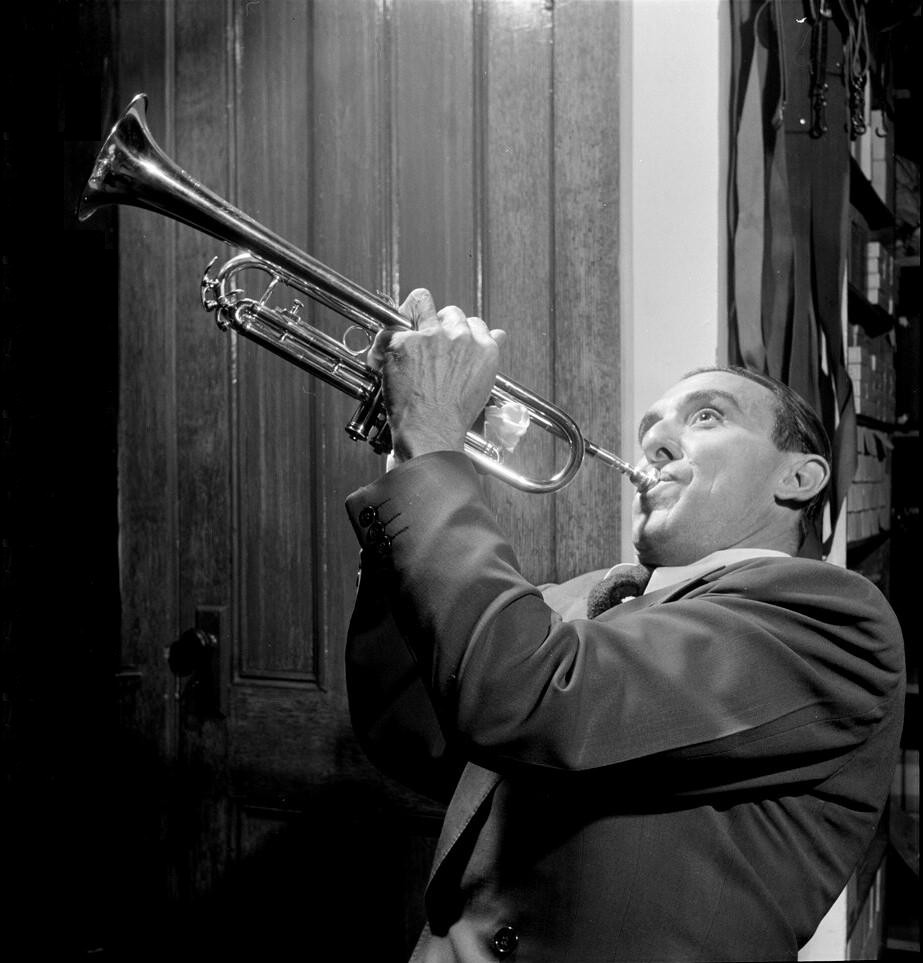
Manone in William P. Gottlieb's office, New York, N.Y., between 1946 and 1948

== Death ==
Manone died on July 9, 1982 in Las Vegas, Nevada, at age 82. He was survived by his son, Joseph Matthew Manone II, a musician, and grandsons Jimmy Manone (also a musician), Joseph Matthew Manone III, and Jon Scott (Manone) Harris.

Manone was featured in Episode 2, "The Gift", in the 2001 documentary Jazz by Ken Burns on PBS on the topic of jazz in the 1920s.

== Discography ==
=== Selected singles ===
Date	Title	Label & Cat. no.	Comments
1937	"Don't Ever Change"	Bluebird Records 7002A^{+}	as Wingy Mannone and his Orchestra
1937	"You're Precious To Me"	Bluebird Records 7002B^{+}	as Wingy Mannone and his Orchestra
1942	"When My Sugar Walks Down The Street"	Bluebird Records 30-0801B^{+}	as Wingy Mannone and his Orchestra
1942	"My Honey's Lovin' Arms"	Bluebird Records 30-0801A^{+}	as Wingy Manone and his Orchestra
