= On the Beach at Bali-Bali =

"On the Beach at Bali-Bali" is a song written by Abner Silver (music), Al Sherman, and Jack Meskill (lyrics). It was written in 1935, copyrighted June 5, 1936, and first recorded by Shep Fields and His Rippling Rhythm Orchestra on May 18, 1936. It was soon covered by Jimmie Lunceford, Tommy Dorsey, and Henry "Red" Allen, among others that same year. In 1937 it appeared in the Marx Brothers film A Day at the Races where Chico Marx played it comedically on the piano.

== History of the title ==
The original title was "On a Street in Baden Baden", but the writers soon realized that Baden-Baden was in Germany. Because in 1935, German dictator, Adolf Hitler threatened the peace of the world; the authors changed the "street" to a "beach" and the city of "Baden Baden" to the tropical (if not fictional) island of "Bali-Bali". Publishers commented that there was, in fact, no place called, "Bali-Bali" and insisted on the name being reduced to one "Bali". However, the writers refused to change the name any further, finally finding a home for their song, new name intact, with the publishing house: Edwin H. Morris Music & Co., Inc. of 1619 Broadway, New York City.

== Literary Sources ==
- Sherman, Robert B. Walt's Time: from before to beyond. Chapter 2; "Al's Time", Pages 98–99. Santa Clarita: Camphor Tree Publishers, 1998.
