= Rymanów =

Town in Krosno County, Poland

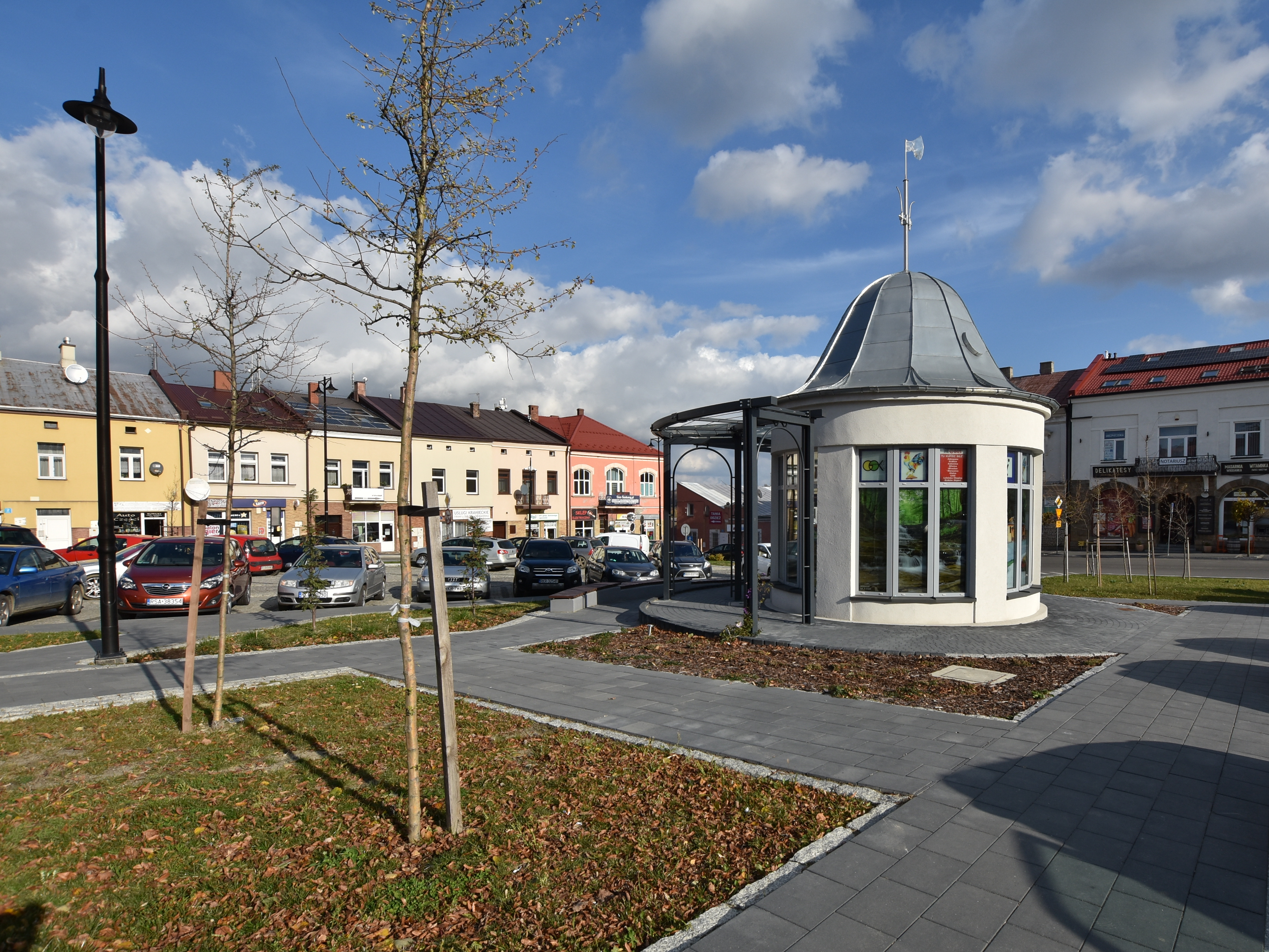
- Market square

- Coat of arms

- Location within Poland
- Coordinates: 49°34′N 21°53′E
- Country: Poland
- Voivodeship: Podkarpackie Voivodeship
- County: Krosno
- Gmina: Rymanów
- Established: 14th century
- Town rights: 1376

Government
  - Mayor: Grzegorz Wołczański

Area
  - Total: 12.39 km^{2} (4.78 sq mi)

Population (2006)
  - Total: 3,564
  - Density: 287.7/km^{2} (745.0/sq mi)
- Time zone: UTC+1 (CET)
  - Summer (DST): UTC+2 (CEST)
- Postal code: 38-480
- Area code: +48 13
- Car plates: RKR
- Website: http://www.rymanow.pl/

Rymanów [rɨˈmanuf] (Note: Latin: Rimanovia or Rimanoa; Ukrainian: Рима́нів) is a town located in the Subcarpathian Voivodeship, in southeastern Poland, with 3,585 inhabitants. It is a capital of a separate commune within Krosno County. Rymanów is situated in the heartland of the Doły (Pits) valley, and its average altitude is 420 metres (1,377.95 ft) above sea level, although there are some hills located within the confines of the town.

== History ==
=== Foundation and early history ===
Renaissance tomb of Jan Sienieński and Zofia Sienieńska in the Saint Lawrence church

The town was built by the Duke Vladislaus II of Opole. Initially the town was named Ladisslavia, after the founder, and was inhabited primarily by settlers of central Germany (Reimannshau), largely overpopulated in Late Middle Ages. In 1376, it received a town charter based on the Magdeburg Law, which granted the town with a significant level self-government. During the reign of Ladislaus I of Poland the town received the modern name of Rymanów, after the first wójt Nicolao Reymann. The town was located on the traditional trade routes leading through the Carpathians to Hungary and in the 15th and 16th centuries it received numerous privileges from various Polish monarchs. This created a boost for local economy, mostly centred on the weekly fairs organized there. The period of prosperity ended in the 17th century, when this part of Poland was repeatedly pillaged and plundered by the invading armies during the wars against Muscovy, Sweden, Turkey and the Khmelnytsky Uprising. Administratively, it was located in the Sanok Land in the Ruthenian Voivodeship in the Lesser Poland Province of the Kingdom of Poland.

Throughout the ages, the town's history was interwoven with the fate of several notable Polish noble families. In 17th and 18th century, it was a private town of the Stadnicki family. In 1731, Teresa Stadnicka married Józef Kanty Ossoliński and the town passed to the mighty Ossoliński family, notable for their collections of books and pieces of art. The latter started the construction of an exceptional parochial church, finished by his daughter Anna Teresa. The latter in 1794 sold the town to Potocki family, who owned it until the 20th century.

The town since the 16th century had also a significant Jewish population, a synagogue is already mentioned in 1593, during a criminal trial at the castle court in Sanok. The local 17th century Bejt-ha-kneset synagogue is one of the exceptional examples of unusual fortified Jewish houses of prayer, used both for religious and military purposes. The local kirkut (established in the 16th century) survived World War II and currently features ca. 800 graves. Among them are tombs of some of the most renown local Jews, including tsadikkim Menachem Mendl, Cwi Hirsch, Józef Friedman and cantor Israel Schorr. There is also a small military cemetery for Jewish soldiers who perished in the fights for the town in 1914 and 1915.

=== Late modern period ===
The town was annexed by Austria in the First Partition of Poland in 1772 and was made part of the Austrian-ruled Galicia. In 1772 it became a part of the Circle of Lesko and in 1864 back to the starostship of Sanok. The town's economy gradually got back on track as it became a local centre of foodstuffs trade for the local peasants. In 1872, the town became the property of Stanisław Potocki and his wife Anna Działyńska, who started to develop a local spa. Much like the nearby town of Iwonicz-Zdrój, Rymanów quickly developed into a popular resort for the inhabitants of Lwów. With the beginning of oil industry in nearby Borysław, a new railway was built only half a mile from the city. This further boosted the local development. In 1898, the town had 3,704 inhabitants, including 1,889 Poles and 1,751 Jews. It had a post office, train station, telegraph and a gymnasium.

=== 20th century ===
After the outbreak of World War I the town was captured by the Russian Empire in September 1914 and severely looted. The spa pavillons were burnt to the ground and the town suffered from several weeks of Russian rule. In 1915, it was again retaken by Austria-Hungary and started to be rebuilt.

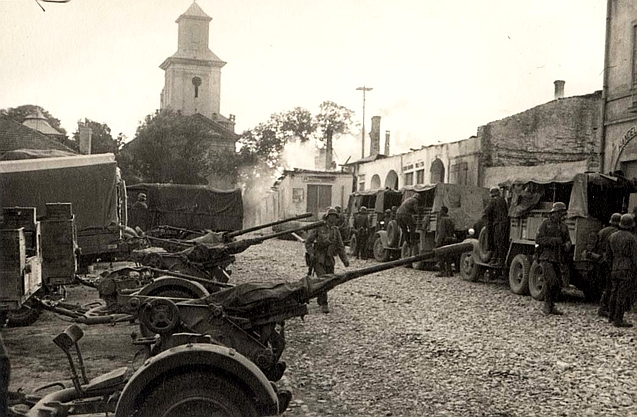
German troops in Rymanów in 1939

After Poland regained her independence in 1918, the town was restored to Poland. However, 20 years afterwards the town was again damaged, this time during the German terror bombings during the invasion of Poland at the start of World War II in 1939. After the Polish defeat, a prisoner-of-war camp was set up in the town's vicinity. Up to 10,000 Soviet prisoners were killed there by the Germans. The camp served also as a transit camp for the Jewish population. The Polish resistance was active in Rymanów; it carried out sabotage operations and established a dedicated organization to provide aid to prisoners of war.

During the German occupation, the Germans immediately robbed and terrorized Rymanów's Jewish population of around 1,400. They were forced into a ghetto near the town center, living with other refugees from neighboring towns, and some were forced into the prisoner of war camp. In August 1942, about 200 men were sent to labor camps, while many women, children, and the ill were rounded up and shot on the spot. The elderly were taken to the woods near Dukla and shot there. The rest were loaded on trains and sent to the Belzec extermination camp where they were murdered. The 400 or so Jews who survived the war were mostly those who fled to the Soviet Union when the Germans invaded though some were hidden locally by Christian acquaintances. The mass murder actions were typical of the fate of Jews in Polish towns and villages during the Holocaust except that many more of Rymanow's Jews survived than was typical.

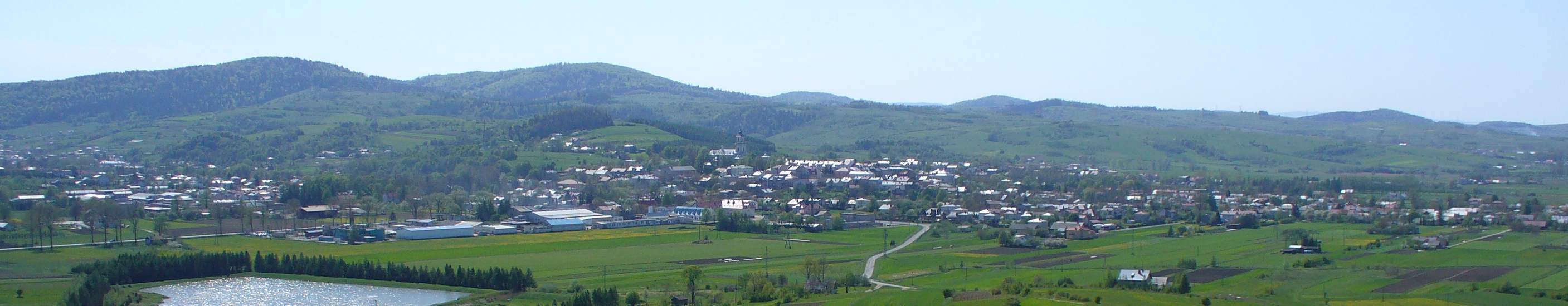
Landscape of Rymanów.

== Image gallery ==
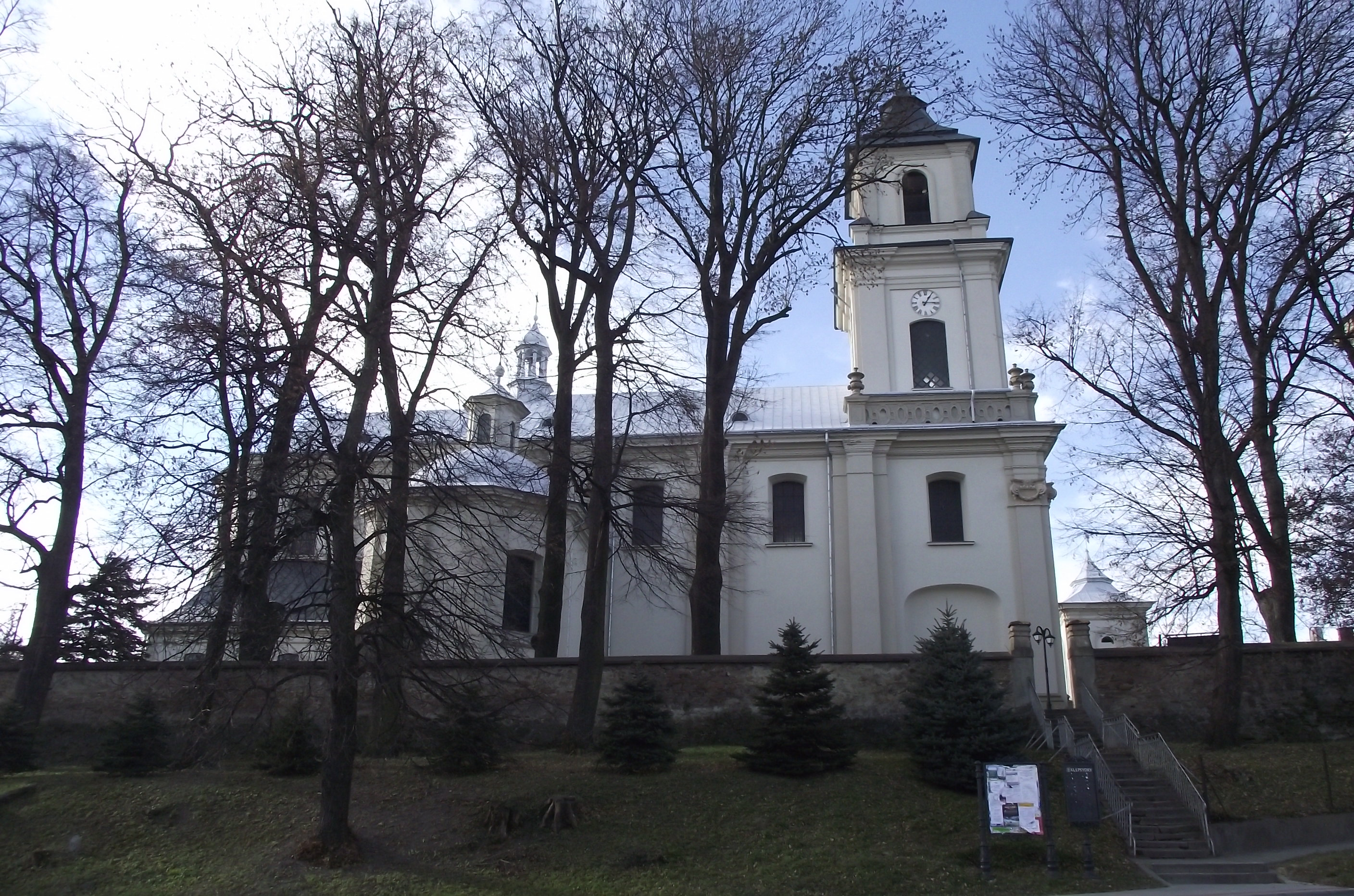
Saint Lawrence Catholic Church

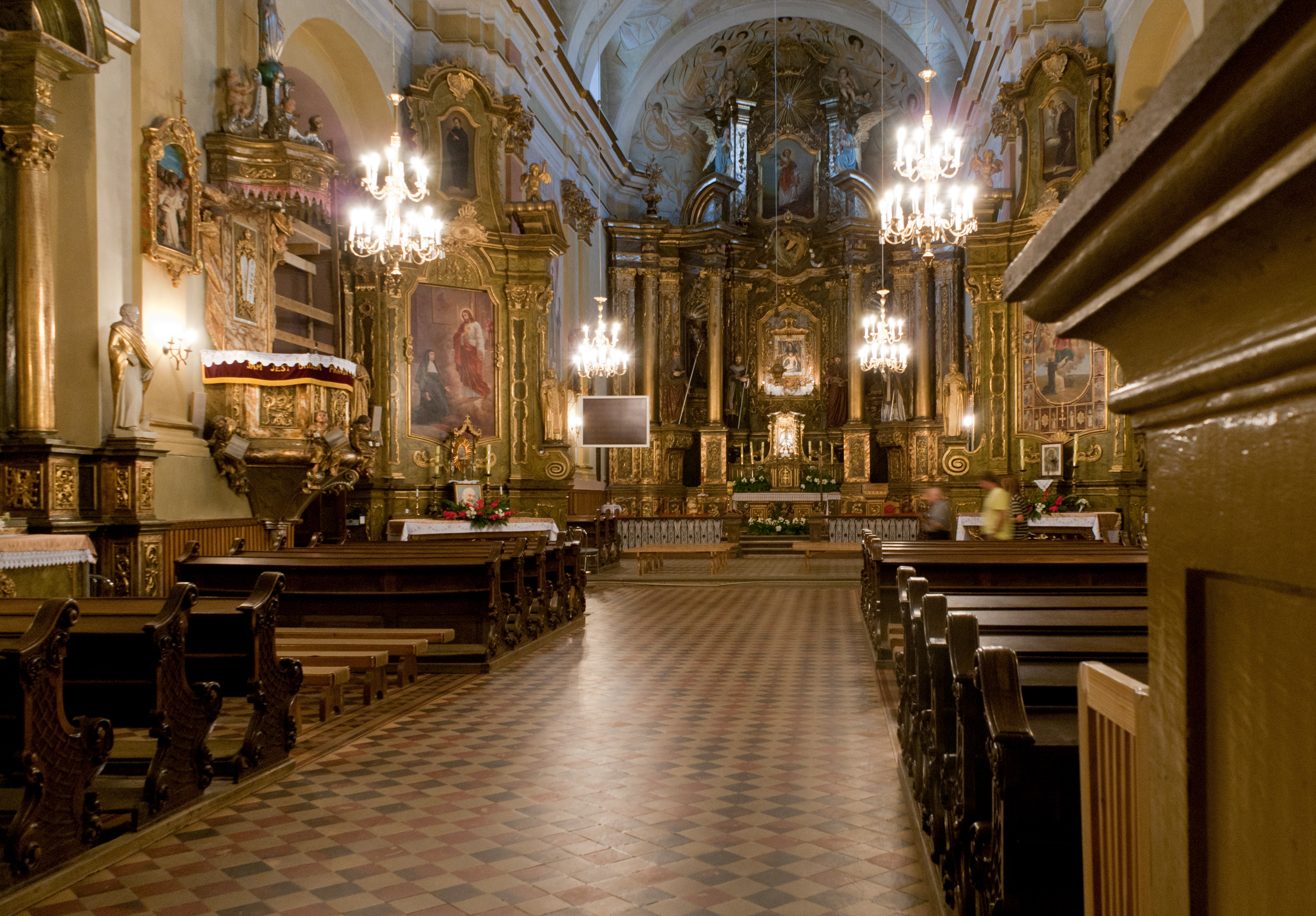
Interior of Saint Lawrence's Church

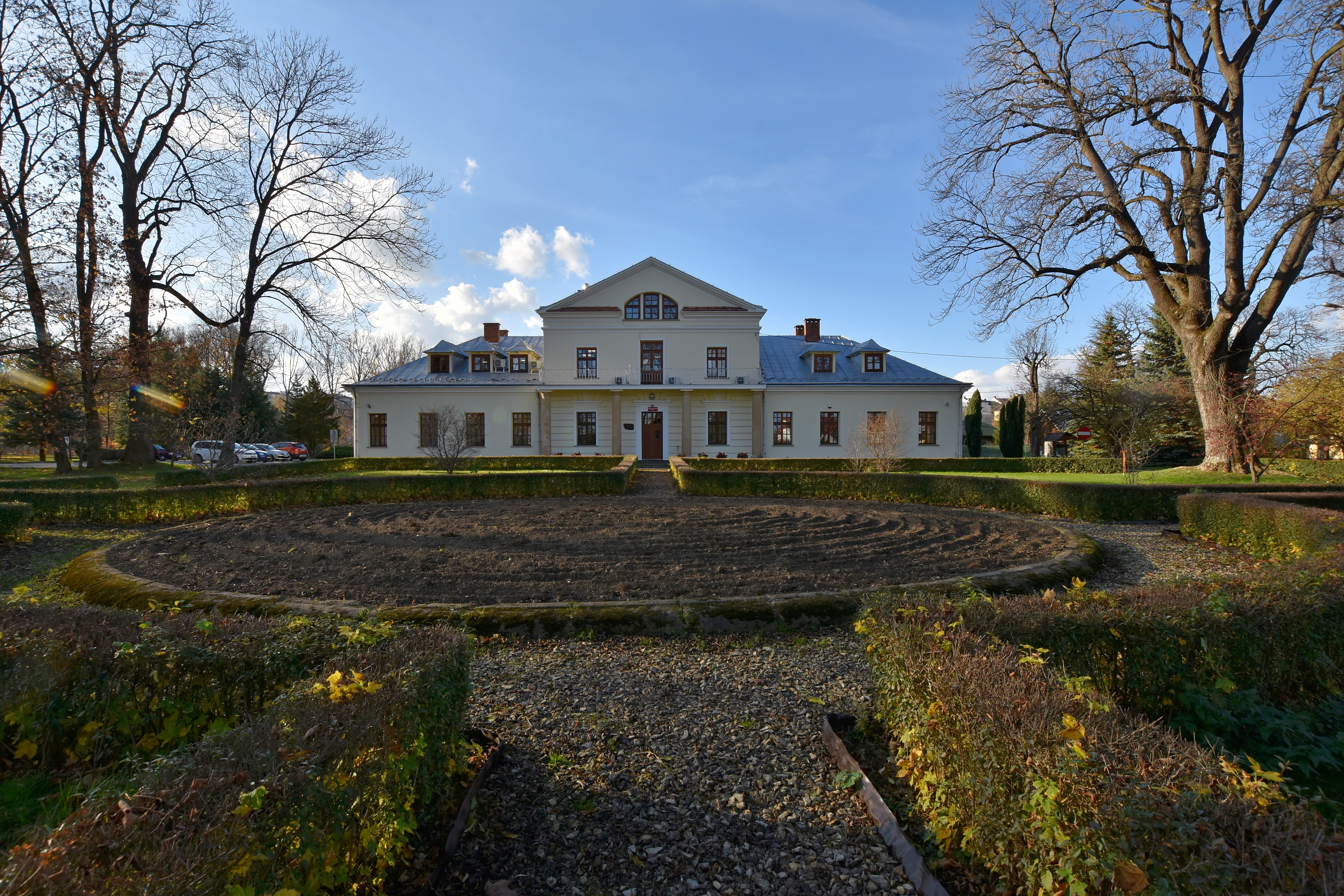
Potocki Palace

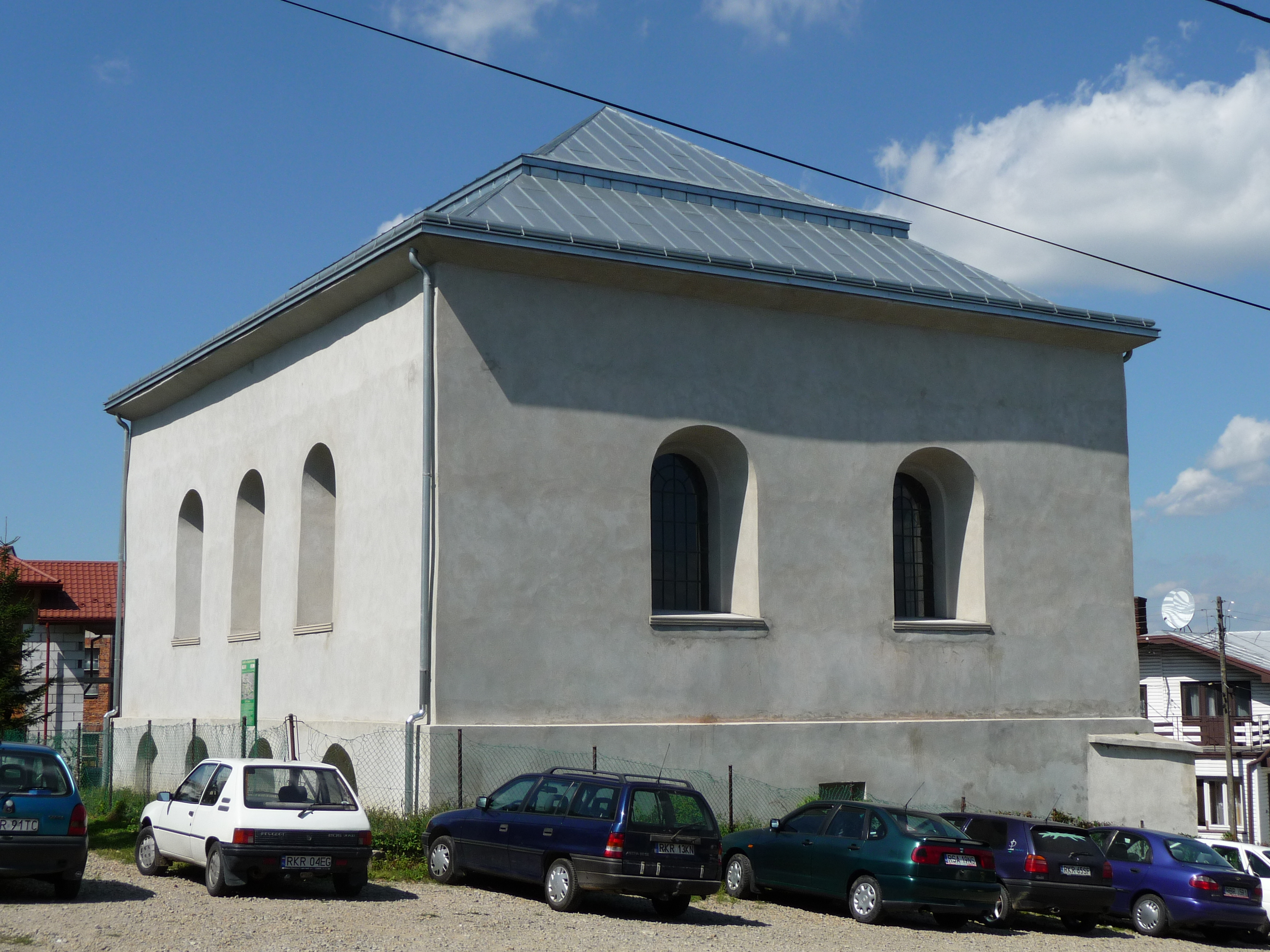
Synagogue (2008)

== Notable people ==
- Robert Biedroń (born 1976), politician and LGBT activist
- Menachem Mendel of Rimanov (1745–1815), Hasidic rebbe and author
- Józef Kanty Ossoliński (1707–1780), magnate in the Polish–Lithuanian Commonwealth
- Isidor Isaac Rabi (1898–1988), winner of the 1944 Nobel Prize in Physics
- Israel Schorr (1886–1935), prominent hazzan
- Edith Schreiber-Aujame (1919–1998), architect
- Tomasz Wacek (born 1976), footballer

== See also ==
- List of Hasidic dynasties
- Rebbe Menachem Mendel of Rimanov
- Rimenov (Hasidic dynasty)
