= Harbour Lights (song) =

Song by Jimmy Kennedy

Song by various
- Published: 1937
- Songwriter: Jimmy Kennedy
- Composer: Hugh Williams

"Harbour Lights", is a popular song by Northern Irish songwriter Jimmy Kennedy with music by Hugh Williams (the pseudonym of exiled Austrian composer Will Grosz). The song was originally recorded by Roy Fox & his Orchestra with vocal by Barry Gray in London on 29 January 1937. Another famous early version was recorded by American singer Frances Langford in Los Angeles on 14 September 1937 and was published again in 1950.

The highest charting version of the song was by Sammy Kaye and His Orchestra which reached number one on Billboard in 1950.

The melody of the song is done in a Hawaiian style, 18 years before this island became a state. Several versions featured a ukulele and a steel guitar.

== Lyrics ==
Kennedy's lyrics describe the sight of harbour lights in the darkness, which signal that the ship carrying the singer's sweetheart is sailing away. The lonely singer hopes that the lights will someday signal the sweetheart's return. Apparently the lyricist Jimmy Kennedy was driving from London (UK) down to Southampton on the South coast along the A3 road which led south to Portsmouth. As he neared the coast a fog descended and he was confused about the direction. He saw some lights on a pub and decided to stop. The pub was called The Harbour Lights. Some time later he wrote the lyric and music was added. The song Harbour Lights was recorded by the Platters and many others.

== Versions ==
The song has been recorded by many artists; charting versions were recorded by Sammy Kaye, Guy Lombardo, Bing Crosby, Ray Anthony, Ralph Flanagan and Ken Griffin. Other versions were recorded by The Ink Spots, Lawrence Welk, Elvis Presley, LaVern Baker, The Platters, Engelbert Humperdinck, Willie Nelson, Jerry Lee Lewis, Vera Lynn, Clyde McPhatter, Arthur Tracy and Jon Rauhouse. A Polish version titled "Portowe światła", with lyrics by Herold (pseudonym for Henryk Szpilman), was recorded in 1938 by Mieczysław Fogg (released as Syrena Electro 2035), shortly after World War II by Tadeusz Miller (released as Melodje 118), and by Irena Santor in 1966 (released as Muza XL0311).

The biggest-selling version was recorded by the Sammy Kaye orchestra. The recording was released by Columbia Records as a 78 rpm single and a 45 rpm single. The record first reached the Billboard charts on 1 September 1950 and lasted 25 weeks, peaking at #1.

The Guy Lombardo orchestra recording of 24 August 1950 was released by Decca Records. The record first reached the Billboard charts on 6 October 1950 and lasted 20 weeks, peaking at #2.

The Bing Crosby recording of 5 September 1950 with Lyn Murray and his Orchestra and Chorus was released by Decca Records. The record first reached the Billboard charts on 3 November 1950 and spent 11 weeks there, peaking at #10.

The Ray Anthony orchestra recording was released by Capitol Records. The flip side was "Nevertheless". The record first reached the Billboard charts on 20 October 1950 and spent 15 weeks in the charts, peaking at #15.

The Ralph Flanagan orchestra recording was released by RCA Victor Records. The record first reached the Billboard charts on 27 October 1950 and lasted 5 weeks, peaking at #27.

The Ken Griffin recording was released by Columbia Records. The record reached the Billboard charts on 20 October 1950 for one week, charting at #27.

In 1960, The Platters' recording peaked at #8 on the Billboard Hot 100 charts and #15 on the Hot R&B Sides chart. In Canada it reached #4, co-charting with "Sleepy Lagoon". Overseas, this version peaked at #11 in the UK. One of the Platters' versions featured the recorded sound of a ship bell ringing, sea birds and a fog horn, plus the sounds of ocean waters splashing, which is heard at both the beginning and the ending of the song, before it fades out.
