= Conrad Lanoue =

American jazz musician

Conrad Lanoue (October 18, 1908 – October 15, 1972) was an American jazz pianist and arranger.

== Early life ==
Lanoue was born in Cohoes, New York on October 18, 1908. He started on piano when he was ten years old and attended the Troy Conservatory.

== Later life and career ==
He began his career in his 20s, playing piano at hotels in his hometown. He recorded with Red McKenzie in 1935, and under the combined leadership of trumpeter Eddie Farley and trombonist Mike Riley in 1935–36. Also in the 1930s he worked for Louis Prima, then Wingy Manone from 1936 to 1940 and pianist Joe Haymes. From the 1940s to the 1960s, he was a member of bands led by Lester Lanin and Charles Peterson, and Hal Landsberry. He also wrote big band arrangements. He retired in 1968 due to illness and died in Albany, New York on October 15, 1972.
