= My Green Fedora =

1935 film by Isadore Freleng

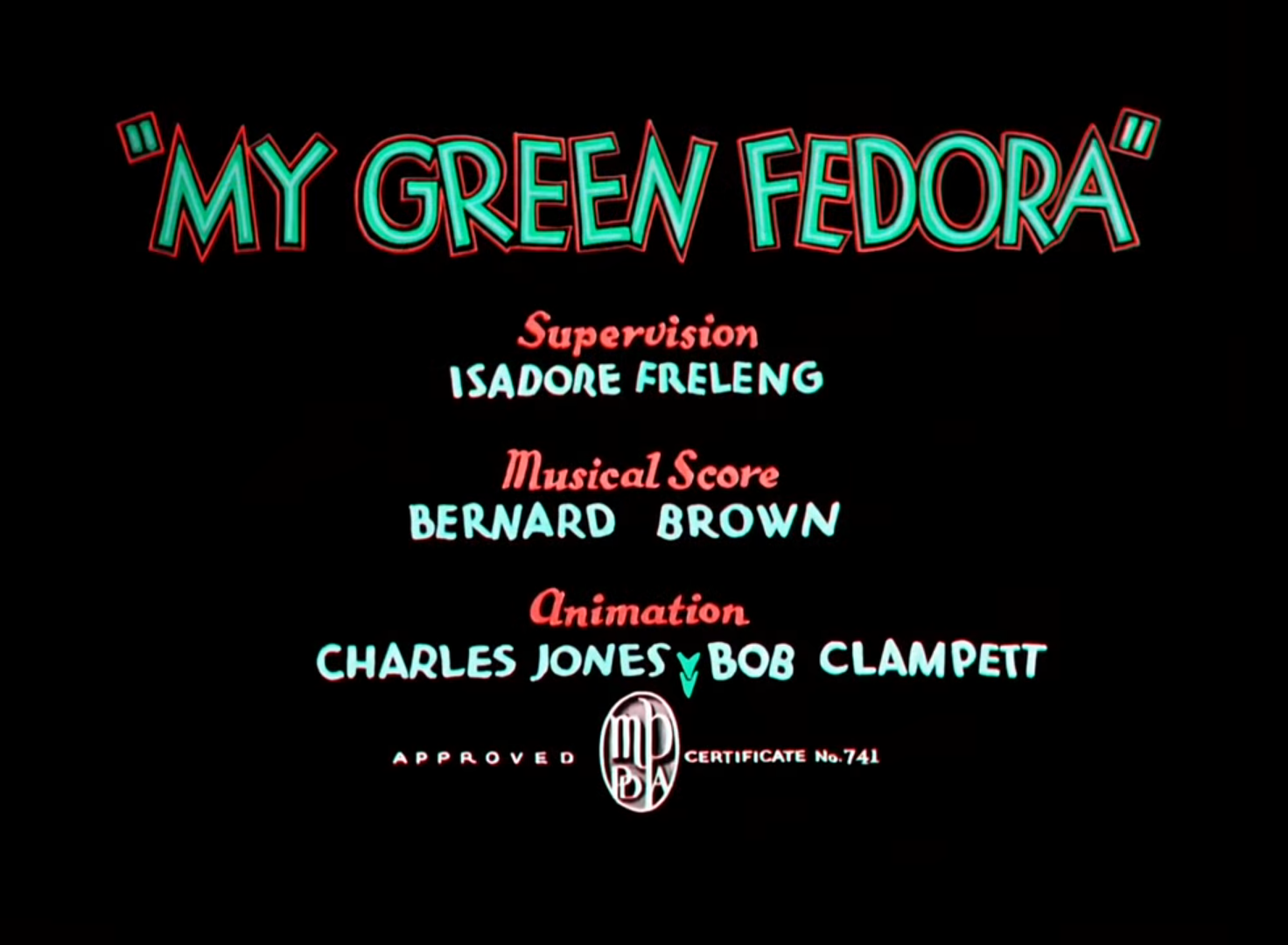
- Title card
- Directed by: Isadore Freleng
- Story by: Bob Clampett
- Produced by: Leon Schlesinger
- Starring: Jackie Morrow; Tedd Pierce
- Music by: Bernard Brown
- Animation by: Charles Jones; Bob Clampett
- Color process: Technicolor
- Production company: Leon Schlesinger Productions
- Distributed by: Warner Bros. Productions; The Vitaphone Corporation
- Release date: May 4, 1935
- Running time: 8 mins
- Country: United States
- Language: English

My Green Fedora is a 1935 American animated comedy short film directed by Isadore Freleng. The short was released on May 4, 1935. It is the 47th film in the Merrie Melodies series and the second to feature Peter Rabbit after Country Boy. It features a song, "I'm Wearin' My Green Fedora", written by songwriters Al Sherman, Al Lewis, and Joseph Meyer specially for this short.

== Plot ==
Peter Rabbit tries to sneak out, but is assigned by his mother to babysit his baby brother Elmer. Peter reluctantly does so, though nothing he tries will stop Elmer from crying. He goes into the closet and has an idea, donning a green fedora and coat, then returns to sing the titular song to Elmer. Elmer is amused by the act and stops crying.

Peter's singing attracts a hungry weasel. As Peter makes his escape from having to handle Elmer's crying, the weasel exploits this opportunity to dig into his house. He pretends to be Peter's mother, calming Elmer before he realizes the weasel's presence. Elmer tries to fight back but is abducted.

Meanwhile, Peter regrets his decision to run away and returns, and is horrified to find Elmer's absence. He tumbles down the hole under the carpet to a tunnel where the weasel tries to cook Elmer. As he gives chase, he reaches the weasel at two tunnels, where he is repeatedly punched into emerging on the other end unconscious. Elmer tries to run away to no avail. The weasel redirects Peter to a tunnel above land while planning to divert to a lower tunnel. This proves to be his undoing as Peter uses a garden hose to flood the tunnels, flushing Elmer and the weasel up on separate holes. As Peter rescues Elmer, he flushes the weasel to the highest point and sends him tumbling into cactus, forcing him to make an escape. Peter flushes Elmer again due to his annoyance at Elmer's laugh.

== Production ==
The film's story was written by Bob Clampett during a contest held by the studio for potential film ideas; his story ultimately won and was adapted into My Green Fedora.

== Reception ==
The Motion Picture Herald gave it a below-average review due to the perceived scariness of the weasel, calling it "Not quite so good as some of this series. A little too scary for the kiddies."

== Home media ==
The short is available on disc 1 of the Looney Tunes Collector's Vault: Volume 3 Blu-ray set.
