= Tomasz Wacek =

Polish footballer

Personal information
- Date of birth: 30 August 1976 (age 50)
- Place of birth: Rymanów, Poland
- Height: 1.77 m (5 ft 10 in)
- Position: Defender

Team information
- Current team: Karpaty Krosno (manager)

Youth career
- Orlęta Krosno

Senior career*
Years	Team	Apps	(Gls)
1994–1999	Karpaty Krosno		
1996–1997	→ Wieczysta Kraków (loan)		
1999–2008	Cracovia		
2008–2009	Górnik Wieliczka	17	(1)
2014	Iskra Przysietnica		
2014–2016	LKS Pisarowce		
2018	Iwonka Iwonicz		

Managerial career
- 2010–2013: Karpaty Krosno
- 2013–2014: Iskra Przysietnica (player-manager)
- 2014–2016: LKS Pisarowce (player-manager)
- 2019–2024: Glinik Gorlice
- 2025–2026: LKS Czeluśnica
- 2026–: Karpaty Krosno
- * Club domestic league appearances and goals

Tomasz Wacek (born 30 August 1976) is a Polish professional football manager and former player who is currently in charge of Klasa A club Karpaty Krosno.

== Managerial statistics ==
As of match played 25 April 2026

Managerial record by team and tenure
Team	From	To	Record							
Team	From	To	G	W	D	L	GF	GA	GD	Win %
Karpaty Krosno	1 January 2010	20 May 2013	107	41	31	35	140	116	+24	38.32
Iskra Przysietnica (player-manager)	6 August 2013	20 May 2014	25	11	5	9	39	35	+4	44.00
LKS Pisarowce (player-manager)	22 May 2014	30 June 2016	77	44	15	18	168	107	+61	57.14
Glinik Gorlice	5 December 2019	11 June 2024	146	67	24	55	278	238	+40	45.89
LKS Czeluśnica	4 September 2025	28 April 2026	21	7	0	14	30	56	−26	33.33
Karpaty Krosno	10 July 2026	Present	0	0	0	0	0	0	+0	—
Total			376	170	75	131	655	552	+103	45.21

== Honours ==
LKS Pisarowce

- Regional league Krosno: 2014–15
- Polish Cup (Krosno regionals): 2015–16

Glinik Gorlice

- Polish Cup (Gorlice regionals): 2019–20, 2020–21, 2021–22, 2022–23, 2023–24
