= Rymanów Synagogue =

Synagogue in Rymanów, Poland

- Synagoga w Rymanowie (Polish)
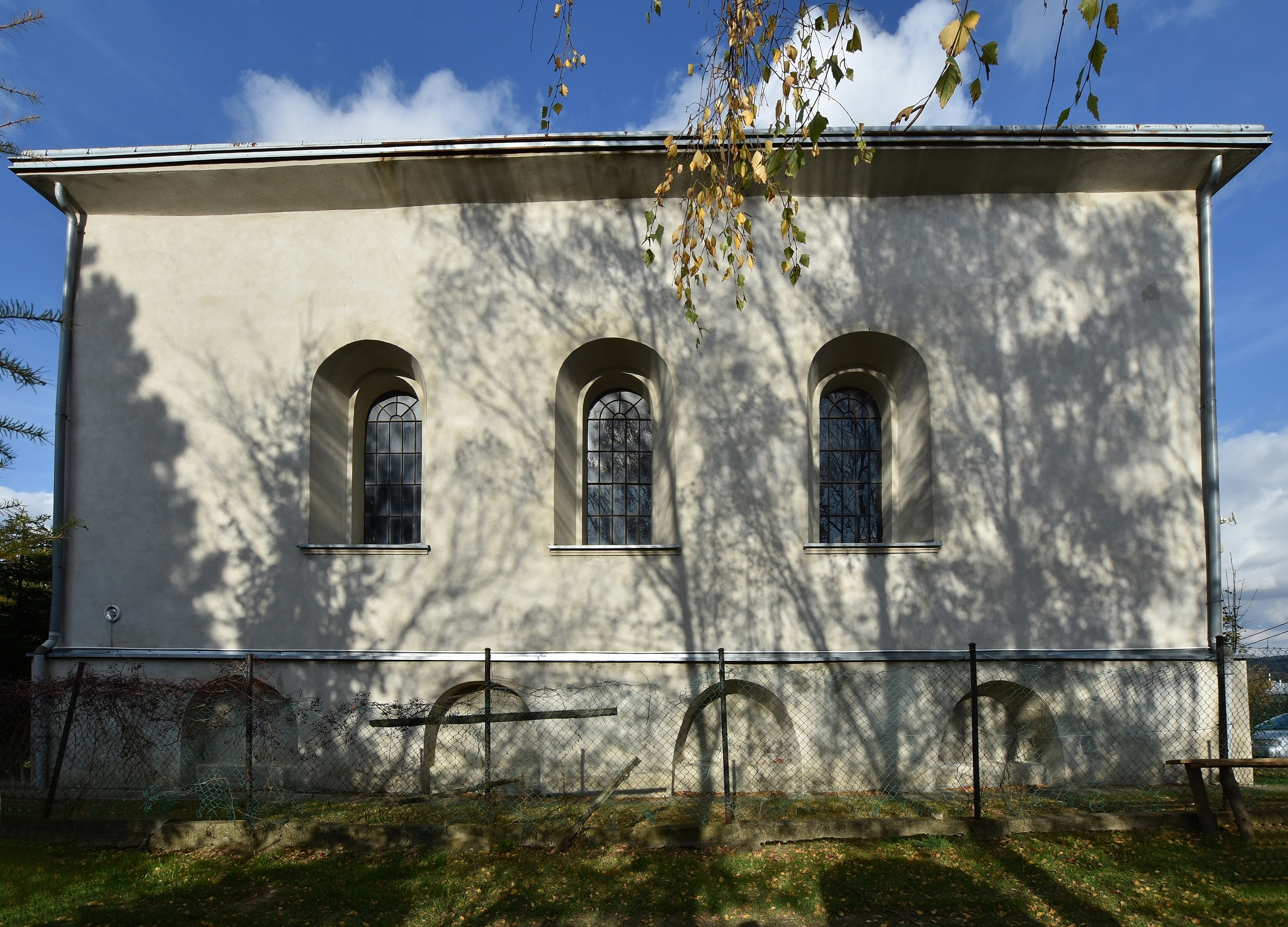
- Southern facade

- Location within Poland

Religion
- Affiliation: Orthodoxy
- Ecclesiastical or organizational status: Under renovation

Location
- Location: Rymanów, Poland
- Interactive map of Rymanów Synagogue
- Coordinates: 49°34′39″N 21°52′02″E

Architecture
- Completed: First half of the 17th century or late 16th century
- Destroyed: World War II
- Materials: brick

The Rymanów Synagogue is a synagogue located in Rymanów, Poland, at 2 Piękna Street. It is the second-oldest synagogue in Outer Subcarpathia and one of the oldest in Poland.

== History ==
The synagogue was constructed in the first half of the 17th century or the late 16th century. It may have been modeled after the Kupa Synagogue in Kraków. In 1920, it underwent a major renovation, during which the barrel vault was removed and elements of Viennese Secession style were introduced. During World War II, the Nazis devastated the synagogue, using it as a warehouse for looted Jewish property and later for grain storage. In 1944, during military operations, the building sustained minor damage and was used as a Soviet military hospital.

After the war, the synagogue's roof was dismantled. In 1957, a fire further damaged the structure. Following this, a decision was made to demolish the synagogue, leading to the removal of adjacent masonry annexes and parts of the main prayer hall's walls. The salvaged stone was used to pave roads. The demolition was halted due to protests by Stefan Stefański, the then-county conservator-restorer in Sanok. Since then, the synagogue remained abandoned and in complete ruin.

In 2005, under the 1997 law on the restitution of Jewish property, the synagogue was transferred to the Foundation for the Preservation of Jewish Heritage.

== Renovation ==
In March 2005, renovation work began, initiated by Congregation Menachem Zion in New York and the Foundation for the Preservation of Jewish Heritage. The first phase involved removing trees growing atop the synagogue, rebuilding the upper sections of the walls, filling in gaps, installing a roof and flooring, and adding windows and doors. This phase concluded on 28 May, the anniversary of Menachem Mendel's death.

Further renovation work began in 2006 and continues to the present day, focusing on the building's interior. Funding for the renovation was primarily raised through the efforts of Rabbi Menachem Abraham Reich. This is the first post-war project in Poland to restore a synagogue for religious purposes. The synagogue is intended to serve Hasidim pilgrimaging to the grave of tzadik Menachem Mendel, as well as function as a center for education and interfaith dialogue.

On 13 April 2007, vandals threw stones, breaking the synagogue's new windows. In May 2008, the new windows were broken again.

== Architecture ==
The masonry synagogue, built from fired brick, river stones, and sandstone blocks, was constructed on a rectangular plan measuring 17.0 x 21.0 m, with walls approximately 11.0 m high and 2.0 m thick, in the Baroque style. It was integrated into the city walls of Rymanów. The interior includes a square prayer hall and a circular tower in the northwestern quoin, which served observational and defensive purposes. The basement likely housed the qahal's prison. Until World War II, annexes adjoined the synagogue: a low babinets to the south, connected to the prayer hall by a series of characteristic openings, and a western annex housing the Jad Charuzim charitable association, the Jewish Artisans' Association, Rabbi Szymon Nosel's cheder, and the qahal chamber.

The main prayer hall features four 8-meter columns with a 50 x 50 cm cross-section, topped with Corinthian capitals, supporting a quadrilateral of semicircular arcades, added during a renovation around 1824. The columns' capitals, made of plaster, reflect the Viennese eclectic style. Their slender design required structural reinforcement, achieved by replacing the original ceiling with a flat ceiling using steel beams and ceramic infill. The bimah was formerly located between these columns.

The walls are divided into four levels. The second level features a series of arcades filled with remnants of prayers painted in glue-based paint in Hebrew and Aramaic, intended for specific Jewish holidays. Over half of the 39 inscription panels contain quotes from the Gemara (tractate Berachot). Some texts use mnemonic abbreviations, such as סמוט (samut), אטלס (atlas), and דמשק (dameshek).

The synagogue contains editorial inscriptions – for example, beneath an Aramaic prayer, it is noted: "These holy words were collected and arranged by the scholar Elimelech Ze'ev, son of the scholar Abraham Yehoshua of blessed memory". In one instance, a 20th-century dedicatory inscription survives at the base of several panels: "Written by Yitzchak, son of Chaya Gitel". Until recently, a signature "B. Fas", likely from 1920, was visible at the base of a painting on the western wall.

On the third level, frescoes depict the Western Wall, David's palace (according to one interpretation, possibly representing the Carmelite monastery in Jerusalem), and four symbolic animals: a tiger, an eagle, a deer, and a lion. The remaining wall sections feature patterned, multicolored tapestry-like paintings. The polychrome decorations were created by painter Berl Fas, assisted by his three sons – Baruch, Symcha, and Meir – between the 1920 renovation and 1935, when Berl Fas emigrated to Palestine.

On the eastern wall, a niche remains from the Torah ark, with traces of Hebrew inscriptions. The southern wall features windows of the babinets, through which women could observe services. A spiral staircase in the synagogue's corner leads to a now-nonexistent attic.

== Gallery ==
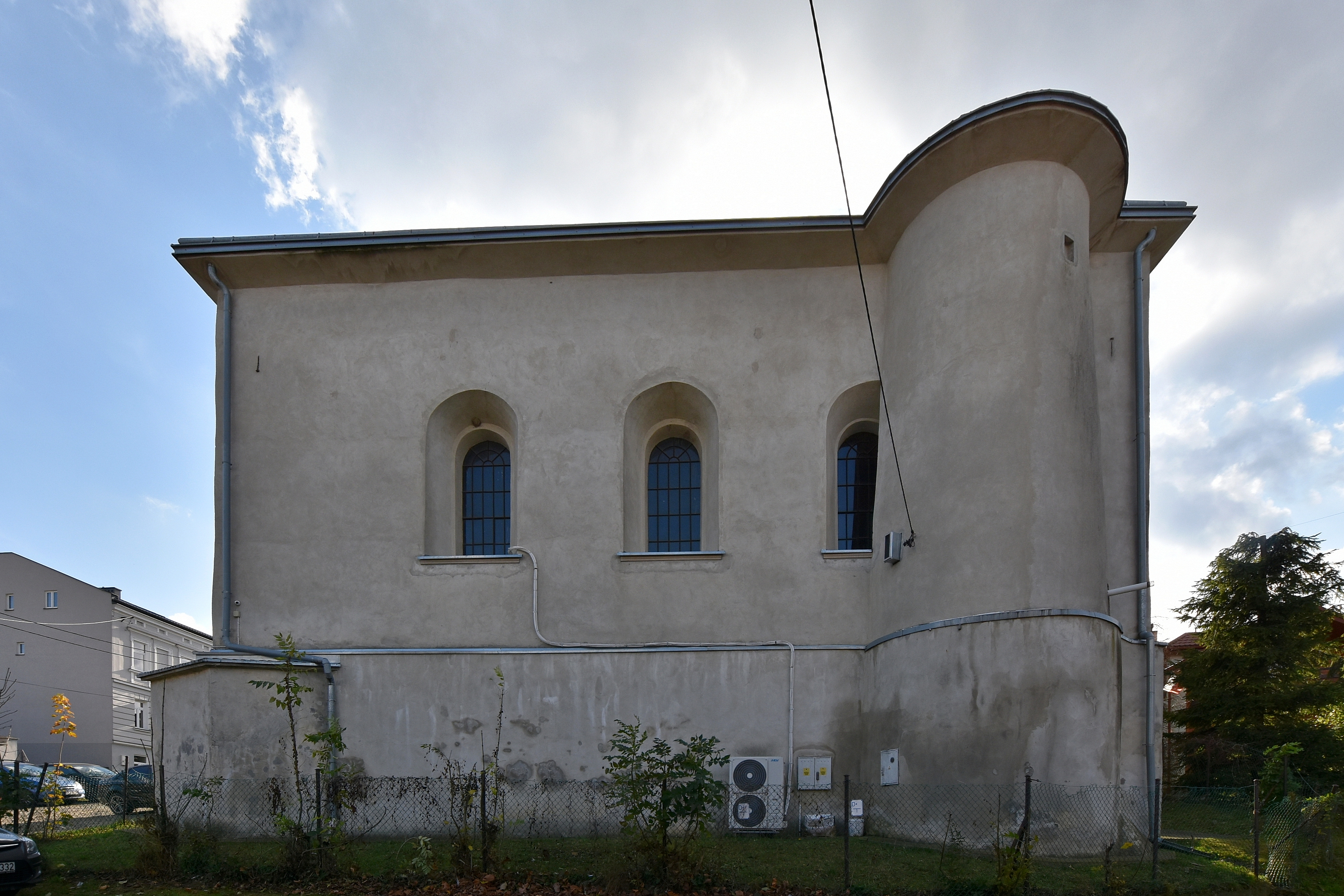
Northern facade

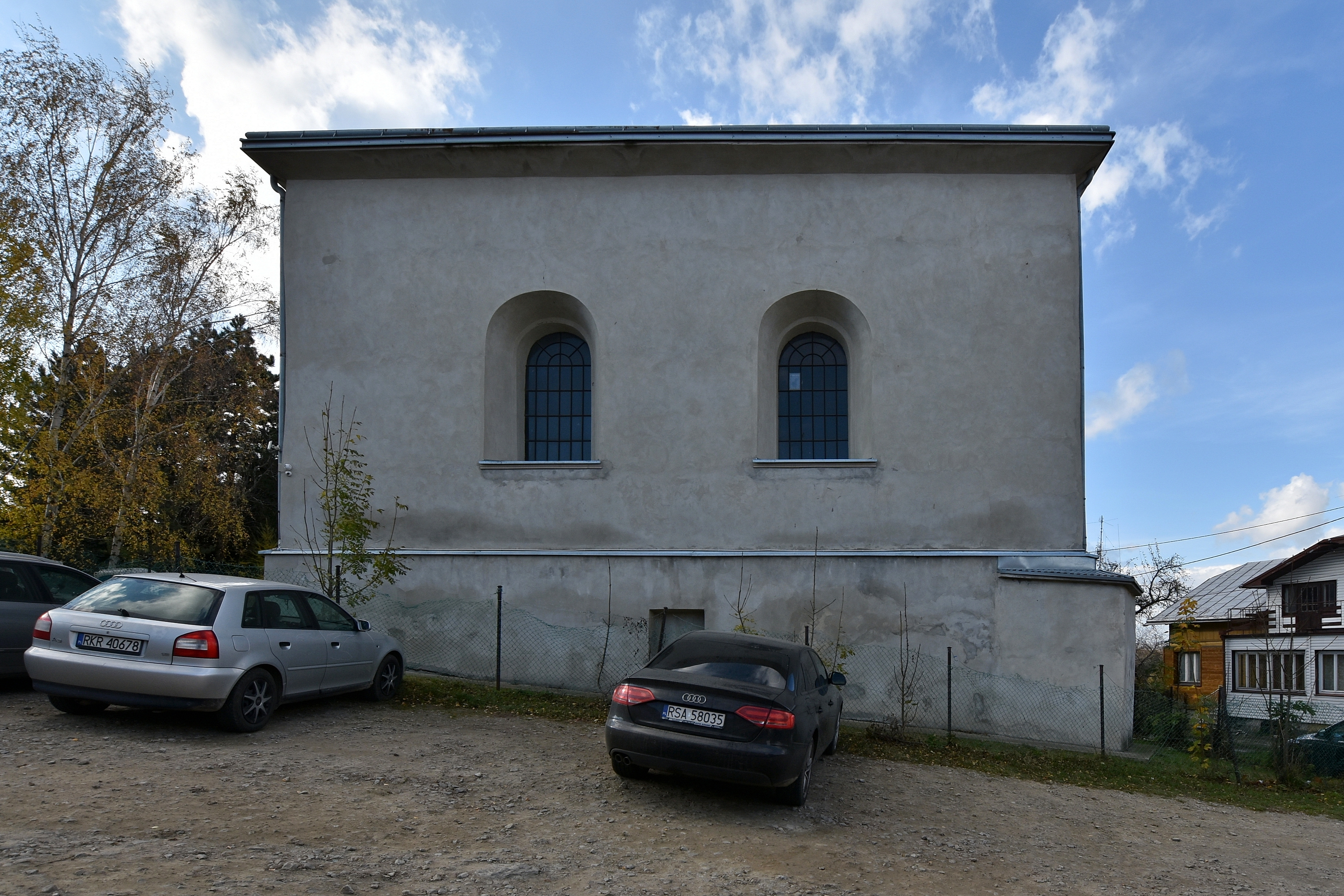
Eastern facade

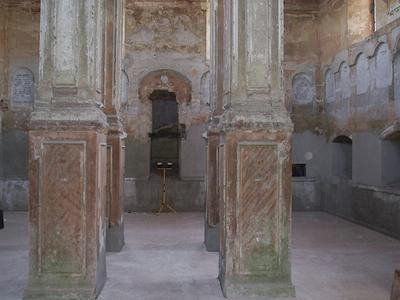
Interior in 2005
