= Edith Schreiber-Aujame =

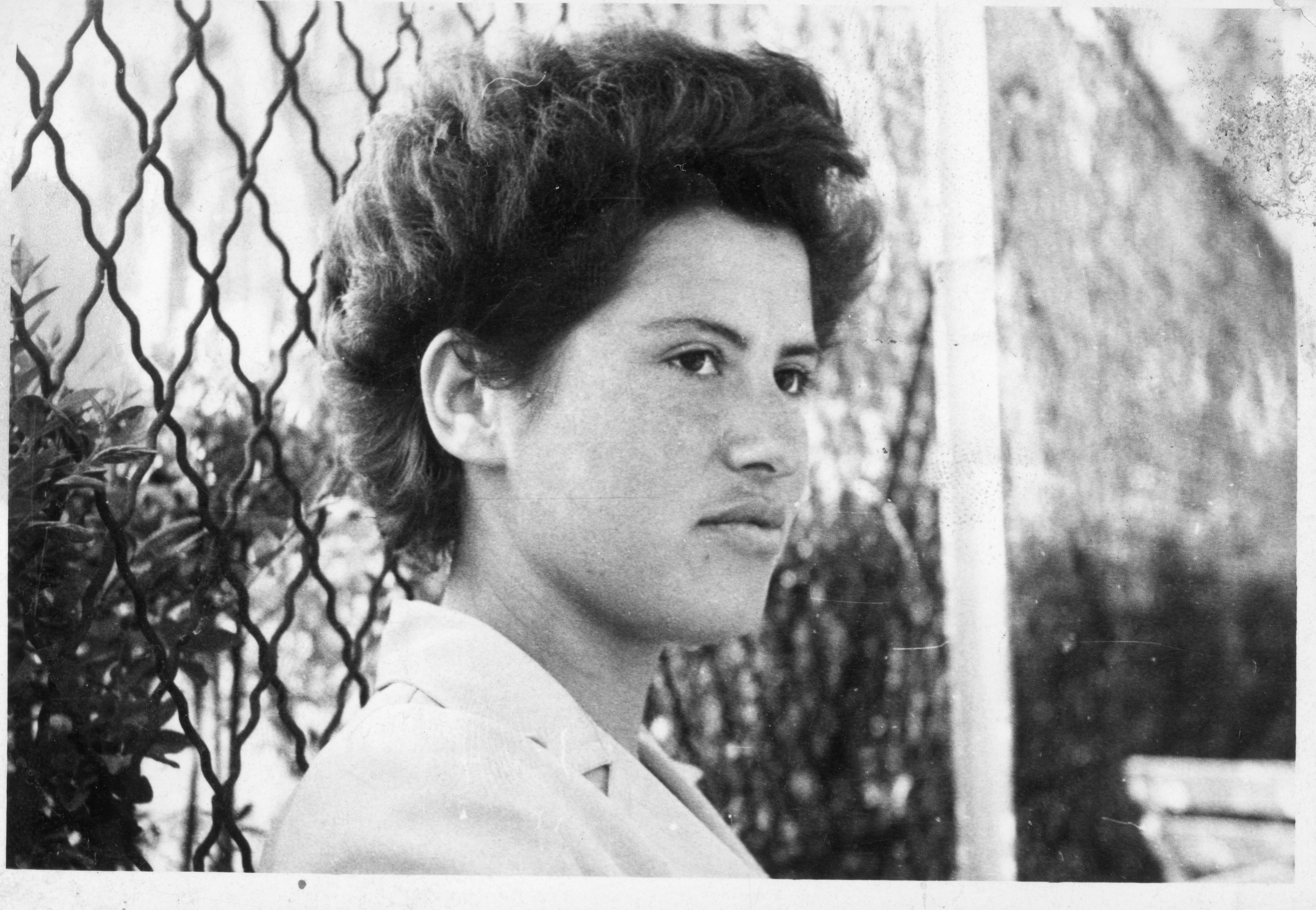
Edith Schreiber Aujame in 1947 in Paris.

Edith Schreiber-Aujame (April 5, 1919 – December 31, 1998) was a Franco-American architect and urban planner. She was born in Rymanów, Poland and died in France.

== Biography ==
In 1926, her family emigrated from Poland and settled in New York. Later, in 1937, she attended the University of Wisconsin, Madison, where she earned a BA in History and Economics in 1940. She then attended the American University simultaneously, where she earned a Master of Economics in 1941, and was a research assistant in Economics for the federal government in Washington D.C. until 1942. She attended a different school from 1942 to 1945, where she was a student at the Graduate School of Design of Harvard University in Cambridge, near Boston. Her director was Walter Gropius and her workshop teacher Marcel Breuer.

From 1946 to 1947, after graduating, she left the United States for Europe. She entered the studio Le Corbusier at 35 rue de Sèvres in Paris. She worked under the direction of Vladimir Bodiansky and Charlotte Perriand, on the details of the Cité Radieuse of Marseille. She met the French architect Roger Aujame there as well, who would later become her husband.

== City planning ==
In 1953, at the CIAM9 (International Congress of Modern Architecture) in Aix-en-Provence, within the CIAM-Paris Group, she presented, an analysis that brought together the essential features of the Paris region and corresponded to the general direction of the group's "Charter for a habitat for the greatest number." The CIAM-Paris group consisted of Roger and Edith Aujame Guy Rottier, Denise Creswell, Gérard Thurnauer, Pierre Riboulet, Jean-Louis Véret, Nicos and Pirkko Chatzidakis, Guy Le Lann and Jean Marcot (though Péré-Lahaille, Préveral and Raccoursier also contributed to this study).

Together with Roger Aujame, she was also involved with:

- the program and realization of an urban planning exhibition of five twinned cities in the town of Boulogne-Billancourt.
- the program and the renovation plan of the C and D sectors of Boulogne-Billancourt.
- a draft multiple combination collective housing project, which would be exhibited in the Paris region and at the CIAM 10 in Dubrovnik in 1956.
- Urban studies:
  - Study of the development prospects of the town of Saint Lunaire (Ille et Vilaine) with the participation of residents and elected officials.
  - Experimental research on housing in rural areas in southern Finistère in order to achieve a more suitable habitat.

=== Architecture and habitat ===
In 1947–1948 she worked for the architecture studio of Nelson Gilbert and Sebillotte on the project to build the Saint Lô hospital (intensive care service, nurses’ rooms, façades).

In 1949–1950, her husband Roger Aujame having been sent by Le Corbusier to New York to work in the design team on the site of the United Nations Secretariat, Edith Aujame worked in Skidmore Owings and Merrill’s architectural firm in New York. Her son Luc was born in New York.

Between 1950 and 1953, back in France, she worked in the architectural offices of J. L. Gauthier, R. Lecaisne, Marcel Lods, and Pingusson. In 1952 she helped create a group of young architects and engineers with Roger Aujame who would be recognized by the CIAM (International Congress of Modern Architecture) under the group name "CIAM-Paris" contributing an analysis of housing conditions in Boulogne-Billancourt.

Between 1953 and 1960, she worked on her own, either alone or in association.

In 1954, she was part of ATIC (Atelier pour l'industrialisation de la construction -Workshop for building industrialization) with Roger Aujame around Jean Prouvé, Maurice Silvy, Gérard Thurnauer, Pierre Riboulet, Michel Bataille, Pirko and Nicos Chatzidakis. In this context she was involved in designing and implementing plans for 190 housing units for Abbé Pierre (Emmaus) in Argenteuil, whose construction would be continued by Roger Aujame.

In 1955, she developed and designed the plans and monitored the implementation of a condominium called "Immeuble Liberté," on Bartholdi St in Boulogne-Billancourt, with their own apartment set up on the top floor.

She also designed and monitored the implementation of a house in Maisons-Laffitte.

Between 1961 and 1965, Roger Aujame worked for the United Nations in Afghanistan, on a mission to work on the city plan of Kabul where she also lived. During this period she worked by herself on:

- Landscape plan of Kabul University: installation of playgrounds, drainage system, choice of species, program, planning and execution.
- Program and design of a production center for educational material for the Ministry of Education in Kabul.
- Agricultural Training Centre, for the Ministry of Agriculture, near Kabul.
- Design of libraries within a number of ministries and the Red Crescent, on behalf of Asia Foundation.
- Horizontal residential city Project for the Bank-i-Milli in Kabul.
- Program and plan for the Surgery Service, Ali Abad hospital
- Plans and construction of houses and buildings with improved traditional or modern techniques.
- Organization of a handicraft center in the old city of Kabul.
- In collaboration with Roger Aujame and Mr. Shafiq Md.:
  - Project for an urban code for the city of Kabul.

In 1968–1969, she taught courses in architecture at the School of Fine Arts in Montpellier.

Between 1973 and 1985, she was part of the architectural firm Develop-Build-Equip (A.B.E.) with architects and urban planners Claude Bensimon and Pierre Talou. In this context she has been associated with numerous research studies or urban planning and architectural designs.

== Publications ==
- Issue on architecture and urbanism in the US - Bulletin of the "U.S. Information Service," US Embassy in Paris – 1954
- "Architecture and Urbanism Soviet 20s by Anatole Kopp" in le Carré Bleu 1967-4
- Collaboration with Le Carré Bleu (International Architecture Review) before 1968, then member of the editorial board from 1968 to 1998 Le Carré Bleu.
- "New schools in England" in Les Cahiers Pédagogiques, 1971
- "Architecture and pedagogical innovation" in Education and Development No. 86, May–June 1973
- "The school in the history of modern architecture" in Le Carré Bleu 1979-3 Le Carré Bleu,
- "Anatole Kopp is no longer" in Le Carré Bleu 1990-2 Le Carré Bleu,
- "About Paris" in Le Carré Bleu 1990-2 Le Carré Bleu,
- "Ghettos and Suburbs" Le Carré Bleu 1990-4 Le Carré Bleu,
- Translator of Le Corbusier "Precisions on the present state of architecture and city planning" MIT Press 1991

For the A.E.P.

- "Educational innovation, architectural consequences" translation of the booklet Educational Facilities Laboratory, 1973
- "Furnishing a schoolhouse" edited and distributed by the C.A.U.E. (Council of Architecture, Planning and Environment of the Côtes d'Armor) and C.D.D.P. (Departmental Centre for Educational Documentation of the Côtes d'Armor) 1983
- "Setting up a Library Documentary Centre", edited by grants from the DRAC Bretagne (Regional Direction of Cultural Affairs) of the Cultural Institute of Bretagne and C.D.D.P. Côtes d'Armor), 1994
