= Red Sails in the Sunset (song) =

Single by Bing Crosby with Victor Young and His Orchestra
- B-side: "Take Me Back to My Boots and Saddle"
- Published: August 14, 1935 by Peter Maurice Music Co., Ltd., London
- Released: November 25, 1935
- Recorded: November 12, 1935
- Studio: Recordings Incorporated Studios, 5505 Melrose Avenue, Los Angeles, California
- Genre: Popular Music
- Length: 3:20
- Label: Decca 616
- Composer: Hugh Williams aka Wilhelm Grosz
- Lyricist: Jimmy Kennedy

"Red Sails in the Sunset" is a popular song. Published in 1935, its music was written by Hugh Williams (pseudonym of Wilhelm Grosz) with lyrics by prolific songwriter Jimmy Kennedy. The song was inspired by the "red sails" of Kitty of Coleraine, a yacht Kennedy often saw off the northern coast of Northern Ireland and by his adopted town Portstewart, a seaside resort in County Londonderry.

The song was used in the Broadway production of Provincetown Follies, which ran from November 3 until December 19, 1935, at the Provincetown Playhouse.

Popular versions in 1935 were by Bing Crosby, Guy Lombardo, Mantovani and Jack Jackson. Another early version was recorded by Al Bowlly with Ray Noble and his Orchestra on September 18, 1935. Louis Armstrong also had a hit with the song in 1936.

The song was revived by Nat King Cole in 1951. This version was released by Capitol Records as catalogue number 1468. It first reached the Billboard Best Seller chart on July 13, 1951, and lasted two weeks on the chart, peaking at number 24.

It was also recorded by Tab Hunter in 1957. The Beatles often performed a rock-and-roll reworking of the song during their early years of nightclub engagements, with Paul McCartney doing the vocals. It was on their setlist when they played at the Star Club in Hamburg, Germany, in 1962. Vaughn Monroe also recorded this song in the late 1940s. Another version was released in 1954 on MGM 11977 by Sam "The Man" Taylor and His Orchestra, with Sam on tenor saxophone.

An instrumental version of the song became the signature tune of the Philippine radio drama series Dear Kuya Cesar, broadcast on DZMM radio (ABS-CBN Corporation) in the 1960s and hosted by Cesar Lacbu Nucum, a.k.a. Kuya Cesar. The song was also the signature tune of Suzette Tarri, a British actress and comedian popular on stage and radio in the 1930s and 1940s.

The song's title inspires the Red Sails Festival, held annually in Portstewart, Northern Ireland. Kennedy wrote the song while staying in Portstewart.

== Recorded versions ==
- Bing Crosby recorded November 12, 1935 for Decca Records with Victor Young and His Orchestra. ····
- Jack Jackson (1935)
- Guy Lombardo (recorded October 11, 1935 for Decca Records 585)
- Leslie (Hutch) Hutchinson (Parlophone R 233 September 1935)
- Anona Winn (featured with enormous success per sheet music 1935)
- Henry "Red" Allen 11/8/1935 Vocalion 3097
- Al Bowlly acc. by orchestra directed by Ray Noble 1935
- Vera Lynn (1935)
- Mantovani (1935)
- Tony Martin (EP ABC-Paramount 90842 / 25 cm 10" ABC-Paramount 1501)
- Louis Armstrong (1936)
- Sven-Olof Sandberg (recorded in 1936 in Swedish under the title "Två solröda segel")
- Albert Ammons (1946)
- Nat King Cole (1951)
- Patti Page (1955 in "The Patti Page Show")
- Vaughn Monroe (1957)
- Rou Yun (柔雲) (1956 in Mandarin Chinese under title name of 夕陽紅帆 & Chinese lyrics by Szeto Ming 司徒明)
- Tab Hunter (1957)
- Big Joe Turner (1957)
- Paul Anka (1958)
- Emile Ford (1960)
- The Platters (1960) – top 40 hit – reaching No. 36 / CAN No. 14
- The Jarmels (1962)
- The Beatles (officially unreleased, 1962)
- Dinah Washington (1962)
- The Three Sounds (1962)
- Earl Grant (1962)
- Fats Domino (1963); Domino's rendition would be the last top 40 hit of his career, reaching No. 35
- Connie Francis (1963)
- The Searchers (1964, Swedish Radio Sessions 1964–1967)
- Stevie Wonder (instrumental) on his 1964 album Stevie at the Beach
- Takeshi Terauchi & Bunnys (instrumental) on their 1967 album The World Is Waiting For Terry
- Dean Martin c. 1968
- Perry Como (1969)
- The Five Keys
- Jimmy McGriff (1971)
- Johnny Lee (No. 22 country hit in 1976)
- Crazy Cavan and the Rhythm Rockers (1979)
- Frank Patterson
- Jay McShann (1996)
- Slim Dusty (1997)
- Dave Brubeck (1999)
- Engelbert Humperdinck (2000)
- Van Morrison (2023)
