= The Most Beautiful Girl in the World (1935 song) =

Song
- Published: 1935
- Genre: Showtune
- Composer: Richard Rodgers
- Lyricist: Lorenz Hart

"The Most Beautiful Girl in the World" is a show tune from the 1935 Rodgers and Hart musical Jumbo when it was introduced by Gloria Grafton and William J. McCartney.

Recordings by Ted Straeter (#27) and by Tommy Dorsey (#21) reached the Billboard Top 40 charts in 1952/53. Other recordings include those by Sonny Rollins, Les and Larry Elgart, Vaughn Monroe, Vic Damone, Tony Bennett, and Frank Sinatra.

In the 1962 MGM movie, Jumbo, the song was sung by Los Angeles session singer, Jimmy Joyce, replacing the voice of actor Stephen Boyd.
