= Wilhelm Grosz =

Austrian composer, pianist and conductor (1894–1939)

Wilhelm Grosz (11 August 1894 – 10 December 1939), sometimes credited as Hugh Williams, was an Austrian composer, pianist, and conductor, who from 1934, worked in the UK, before moving to the USA in 1938. Grosz composed both classical concert works and (from exile) internationally successful popular songs.

== Life ==
Wilhelm Grosz was born in Vienna to a wealthy Jewish family. He studied music with Richard Robert (piano), Franz Schreker (composition) and Guido Adler (musicology). In 1921 he was appointed conductor of the Mannheim Opera, but returned to Vienna in 1922, where he worked as a pianist and composer. From 1927, he was the artistic manager of the Ultraphone Gramophone Company (Deutsche Ultraphon AG) in Berlin, where he was involved with more popular music forms. In 1933, he became conductor of the Kammerspiele Theater in Vienna.

Forced to flee his native land because of the Nazi takeover, Grosz resettled in England in 1934. Finding little interest there for his avant garde musical style, he instead applied his talents to setting the lyrics of popular songs, some of which became international successes. Most of his most popular titles were written with lyricist Jimmy Kennedy: "Harbour Lights", "Red Sails in the Sunset", "When Budapest Was Young", and "Isle of Capri". "Tomorrow Night" was written with Sam Coslow. For these songs he used the name Will Grosz, and later Hugh Williams.

He emigrated to the United States in 1938, but died in 1939 in New York City, aged 45, only a few months after arriving. He had been en route to Hollywood. His children were still in Europe.

== Music ==
Grosz's classical compositions include three operas. The one act opera buffa Sganarell, after Molière, was first produced in Dessau in 1925. Der arme Reinhold (Berlin, December 1928), is sub-titled "a danced fable". Achtung, Aufnahme! (Frankfurt, March 1930), a zeitoper to a libretto by Bela Balazs, is a modern musical comedy. There were also two ballets, incidental music for three plays, scores for a number of films, orchestral works, a Symphonic Dance for piano and orchestra, chamber music (including a violin sonata, 1925), piano pieces and songs (including the song cycle Liebeslieder). Some works, such as Jazzband for violin and piano (1924), introduced jazz elements into concert music. Gottlieb Wallisch has issued two CDs of his piano music.

Afrika-Songs, a song cycle for two vocal soloists and chamber ensemble, was first performed in 1930. It utilizes texts by African-American poets, mainly Langston Hughes, and a strongly blues-flavored sound. Afrika-Songs was recorded, along with a selection of Grosz's popular tunes and some of his other works, in the mid-1990s by Decca Records as part of their series called Entartete Musik (subtitled "Music Suppressed By the Third Reich").

== Selected filmography ==
- Who Takes Love Seriously? (1931)
- His Majesty and Company (1935)
