= Broadway Gondolier =

1935 film by Lloyd Bacon

- Theatrical release three-sheet poster
- Directed by: Lloyd Bacon
- Written by: Sig Herzig; E.Y. Harburg; Hanns Kräly
- Screenplay by: Warren B. Duff; Sig Herzig
- Produced by: Samuel Bischoff
- Starring: Dick Powell; Joan Blondell; Adolphe Menjou
- Cinematography: George Barnes
- Edited by: George Amy
- Music by: Heinz Roemheld; Leo F. Forbstein
- Production company: Warner Bros. Pictures
- Distributed by: Warner Bros. Pictures
- Release date: July 27, 1935
- Running time: 99 minutes
- Country: United States
- Language: English
- Budget: $397,000
- Box office: $1,119,000

Broadway Gondolier is a 1935 American musical film directed by Lloyd Bacon. The film was released by Warner Bros., and featured Dick Powell, Joan Blondell and Adolphe Menjou.

== Plot ==
Richard "Dick" Purcell, a taxi driver, aspires to achieve his dream of becoming a singer. After a couple of theatre critics discover him while riding in his cab, one of them recommends him to a radio producer. The producer's secretary, Alice Hughes, hears him sing and falls in love with him. She sets up an audition for Dick to sing for the sponsor, Mrs. Flagenheim. He's late for his audition and blows his big chance.

Convinced she must go to Italy to find a good enough singer, with enough "romance" to represent her fine cheese products, Mrs. Flagenheim takes Alice with her to find one in Venice. Dick watches as Alice boards the ship and manages to get on board and work for his passage to Italy. When in Venice, he looks up his friend and mentor from New York City, professor de Vinci, who had gone ahead to use his old connections to help Dick's singing career. They manage to score a couple of jobs as gondoliers for an upcoming event.

Dick uses the opportunity to showcase his voice. Mrs. Flagenheim hears him and wants to sign him to a contract immediately, thinking he's an authentic Italian named "Ricardo Purcelli". Alice recognizes him, but they continue to hide his true identity and they all go back to New York. However, his fellow taxi drivers recognize him as soon as he gets off the boat. Richards is appalled the moment he lays eyes on him, but Alice convinces him that “Ricardo”’ will get away with it. He instantly becomes a radio sensation. Alice's jilted boyfriend figures out that Ricardo Purcelli is actually just Dick and gives him an ultimatum. Dick must decide if he wants to continue masquerading as Ricardo and finally attain the fame and fortune he'd always dreamed of....or give it all up for Alice, the one he loves. Dick keeps singing, because Alice wants him to. Too many people depend on him. One of the cabbies gives the story to the newspapers and rumors spread. Alice lies to Dick, letting him think that she would not marry him if he gave up the pretense. Sick of being a phony, Dick reveals the truth on the air and walks out. The papers are full of the news. Thousands of fans write to say they love Dick's voice and don't care about the rest. Everyone is looking for him, especially Alice, who wants to tell him that she'll live with him anywhere. De Vinci literally runs into Dick in the street when their cabs collide and rushes him to the studio in time for the broadcast of the Flagenheim Cheese Hour with the Broadway Gondolier. Alice hears the broadcast and rushes to the studio and into his arms.

== Cast ==
- Dick Powell as Richard 'Dick' Purcell, aka Ricardo Purcelli
- Joan Blondell as Alice Hughes
- Adolphe Menjou as Professor Eduardo de Vinci
- Louise Fazenda as Mrs. Flagenheim
- William Gargan as Cliff Stanley
- George Barbier as Music Critic Hayward
- Grant Mitchell as E. V. Richards, Radio Producer
- The Mills Brothers as themselves
- George Chandler as Photographer

== Box office ==
According to Warner Bros records the film earned $795,000 domestically and $324,000 foreign.
