= Jimmy Kennedy =

Irish songwriter (1902–1984)

Background information
- Born: James Kennedy; 20 July 1902; Omagh, County Tyrone, Ireland
- Died: 6 April 1984 (aged 81) Cheltenham, Gloucestershire, England
- Occupations: Songwriter, lyricist

James Kennedy OBE (20 July 1902 – 6 April 1984) was an Irish songwriter. He was predominantly a lyricist, putting words to existing music such as "Teddy Bears' Picnic" and "My Prayer" or co-writing with composers such as Michael Carr, Wilhelm Grosz and Nat Simon. In a career spanning more than 50 years, he wrote some 2000 songs, of which over 200 became worldwide hits and about 50 are popular music classics.

== Early life ==
Kennedy was born in Omagh, County Tyrone, Ireland. His father, Joseph Hamilton Kennedy, was a policeman in the Royal Irish Constabulary (RIC). While growing up in the village of Coagh, Kennedy wrote several songs and poems. He was inspired by local surroundings; the view of the Ballinderry River, the local Springhill House and the plentiful chestnut trees on his family's property, as evidenced in his poem "Chestnut Trees". Kennedy later moved to Portstewart, a seaside resort in County Londonderry.

Kennedy graduated from Trinity College, Dublin, before teaching in England. He was accepted into the Colonial Service, as a civil servant, in 1927.

== Music career ==
While awaiting a Colonial Service posting to the colony of Nigeria, Kennedy embarked on a career in songwriting. His first success came in 1930 with "The Barmaid's Song", sung by Gracie Fields. Fellow lyricist Harry Castling introduced him to Bert Feldman, a music publisher based in London's "Tin Pan Alley", for whom Kennedy started to work. In the early 1930s, he wrote a number of successful songs, including "Oh, Donna Clara" (1930), "My Song Goes Round the World" (1931), and "The Teddy Bears' Picnic" (1933), in which Kennedy provided new lyrics to John Walter Bratton's tune from 1907.

In 1934, Feldman turned down Kennedy's song "Isle of Capri", but it became a major hit for a new publisher, Peter Maurice. Kennedy wrote several more successful songs for Maurice, including "Red Sails in the Sunset" (1935), inspired by beautiful summer evenings in Portstewart, Northern Ireland; "Harbour Lights" (1937); and "South of the Border" (1939), inspired by a holiday picture postcard he received from Tijuana, Mexico, and written with composer Michael Carr. Kennedy and Carr also collaborated on several West End shows in the 1930s, including London Rhapsody (1937). "My Prayer", with original music by Georges Boulanger, had English lyrics penned by Kennedy in 1939. It was originally written by Boulanger with the title "Avant de Mourir" in 1926.

During the early stages of the Second World War, while serving in the British Army's Royal Artillery, where he rose to the rank of captain, he wrote the wartime hit, "We're Going to Hang out the Washing on the Siegfried Line". His hits also included "Cokey Cokey" (1945; known as "The Hokey Pokey" and "Okey Cokey" in several locales), and the English lyrics to "Lili Marlene". After the end of the war, his songs included "An Apple Blossom Wedding" (1947), "Istanbul (Not Constantinople)" (1953), and "Love Is Like a Violin" (1960). In the 1960s, Kennedy wrote the song "The Banks of the Erne", for recording by his friend from the war years, Theo Hyde, also known as Ray Warren.

He wrote the music to the play Spokesong (1975) which was staged in Lond's West End in 1976 and on Broadway in 1979.

== Awards ==
Kennedy won two Ivor Novello Awards for his contribution to music and received an honorary degree from the New University of Ulster. He was awarded the OBE in 1983. In 1997 he was posthumously inducted into the Songwriter's Hall of Fame.

== Death ==
Kennedy died in Cheltenham on 6 April 1984, aged 81, and was interred in Taunton, Somerset, England. He was survived by two sons and a daughter.

== Selected songs ==
- "Blaze Away", added lyrics to the Abe Holzmann marching song in 1931
- "Barmaids Song"
- "Red Sails in the Sunset"
- "South of the Border"
- "We're Going to Hang out the Washing on the Siegfried Line"
- "The Isle of Capri"
- "Istanbul (Not Constantinople)"
- "My Prayer"
- "Teddy Bears' Picnic"
- "Love is Like a Violin" (derived from "Mon cœur est un violon" by Miarka Laparcerie - J. Richepin)
- "Cokey Cokey"
- "Roll Along Covered Wagon"
- "Harbour Lights"
