= Aviva Semadar =

Israeli folklore singer (1935–2025)

Aviva Semadar אביבה סמדר
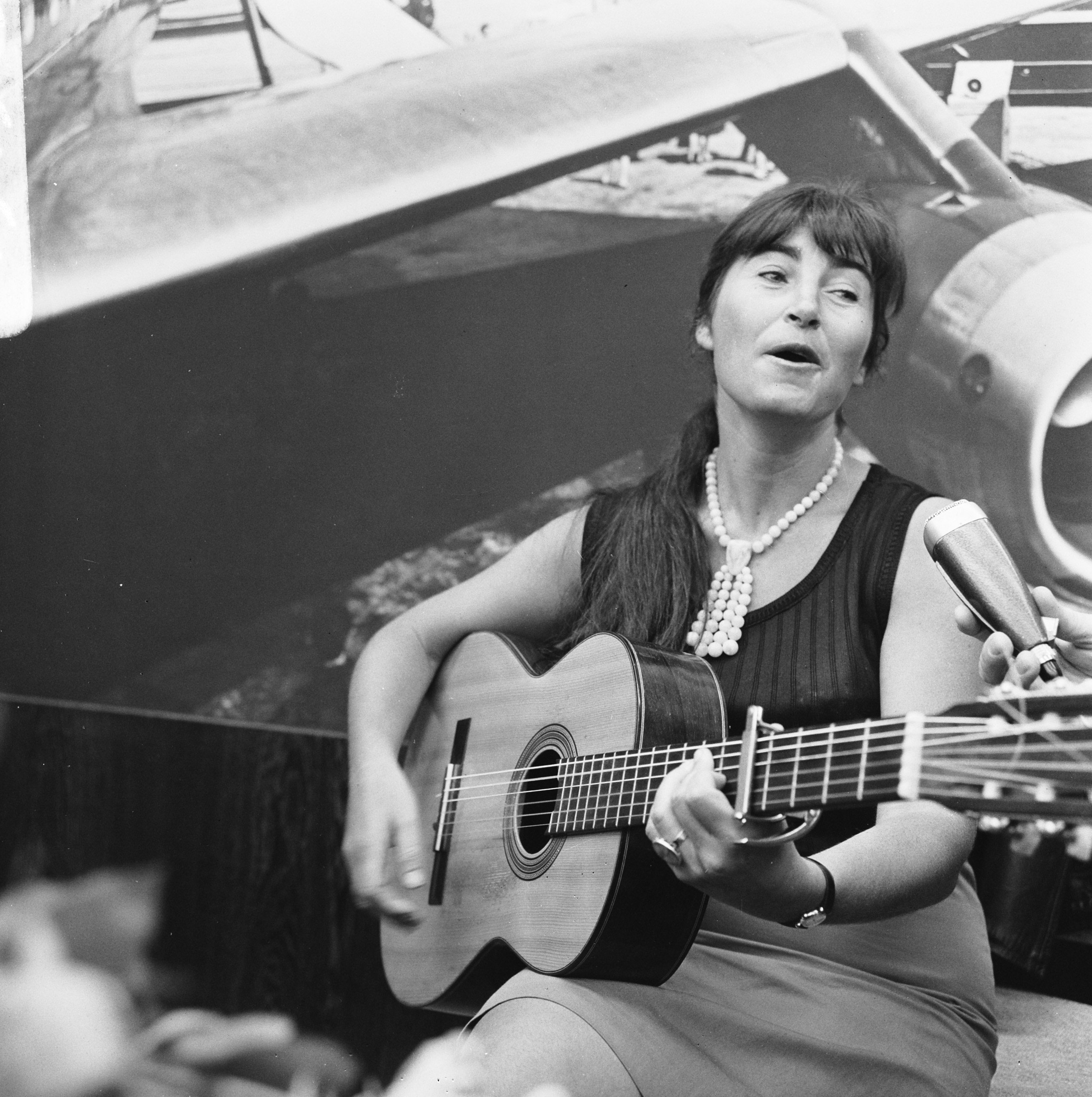
- Semadar in 1966

Background information
- Born: 20 March 1935; Tel Aviv, British Mandate Palestine
- Died: 18 March 2025 (aged 89)
- Genres: Folk music; chanson
- Occupations: Singer-songwriter
- Instrument: Guitar
- Years active: 1963–2003
- Label: Westdeutscher Rundfunk
- Website: aviva-semadar.de

Aviva Semadar (Hebrew: אביבה סמדר; 20 March 1935 – 18 March 2025) was an Israeli folklore and chanson singer, who performed in solo concerts and at festivals abroad (Portugal, Netherlands, USA, Germany, etc.) since 1963, and hosted a regular music program on West German Broadcasting from 1973 to 2003.

== Early life ==
Semadar's mother's family, the Jaffes, originated from Minsk, and settled in Palestine at the beginning of the 19th century. They included teachers and cantors who contributed to the spiritual and cultural Renaissance of Judaism in modern times and to the revival of the Hebrew language. Semadar's father, Nachum, immigrated from Vilnius to Palestine in 1925–26, and introduced his daughter to the culture of Eastern European Jews, the Yiddish language, and Yiddish songs. Semadar studied Bible, literature, and history at the Levinsky Teacher's Seminary in Tel Aviv, and underwent four years of training to become a coloratura soprano. In 1955, she passed her teaching exam and, after serving two years in the Israeli Air Force, taught at several schools. During this time, she began collecting songs and compiling a singing repertoire that showcased her strong, clear metallic voice. Initially it mainly consisted of Hebrew and Yiddish folk tunes and liturgical chants taught to her by her grandfather, David Jaffe, a cantor in a synagogue.

== Career ==
In the early 1960s, Semadar took a leave of absence from teaching, and used a private US travel scholarship to study traditional music traditions in Europe. She first stayed in Lisbon to learn the art of singing Fado from various fadistas and guitar playing from the guitarist and luthier José Duarte Costa. This was followed by Flamenco courses (singing and guitar, among others with Paquito Simón) in Spain, a seminar with a Swiss yodeling teacher, and seven months of lessons with vocal teacher Viktoria Prestel in Munich. She also performed in student clubs and small venues. After four years she returned to Israel, where she made some radio appearances, and performed in a solo concert in Tel Aviv that received positive press reviews. However, this did not lead to a career in her home country.

Semadar made her television debut on 10 August 1963, in the Netherlands, followed by a several-week concert series at the Amsterdam cabaret theater Hypokriterion, and further performances in several Dutch cities. On 2 December 1963, she sang ten folk songs from different countries at the gala event Europe 1. 2. 3. in the RAI Congress Center in Amsterdam, in the presence of the Dutch Crown Princess, and later Queen Beatrix. On 7 May 1964, she performed as a soloist at a concert evening of gospel singer Mahalia Jackson in the Ahoy Hall in Rotterdam in front of 5,000 spectators. Subsequently, Lou Mindling, the impresario of Jackson, offered her collaboration, and in 1966 she gave concerts with Jackson in the USA. She also performed at festivals in Edinburgh and Newport, as well as at the Burg Waldeck Festival (1965 and 1966). The first records featuring Semadar's performances were released in 1964.

Semadar's first performance in Germany was a concert in Aachen on 4 June 1964, and on 13 June 1964, she made her first appearance on German television, in the regional program Hier und heute on West German Broadcasting. Later, she moved her base to Cologne, where she was a freelance employee of WDR for three decades from 1973 onwards, and produced various folklore programs on the radio (Folk music from around the world, From the Bosporus to Gibraltar, etc.). In the 1970s, she frequently appeared with songs from her repertoire on German television (including the special Aviva Semadar sings new folklore, 30 minutes, 1970), and gave solo concerts in the WDR studio (Matinee der Liedersänger, etc.) as well as individual concert evenings at various stages and venues in Germany and neighboring countries, such as in 1979 at the Theater Bel Etage in Zurich, 1980 at the Contra-Kreis-Theater in Bonn and in 1984 at the Alte Oper Frankfurt and as part of a Christian-Jewish forum at the German Catholic Day in the Robert Schumann Hall in Düsseldorf.

In addition Semadar composed some songs, which she often performed at public appearances and in her radio broadcasts; the lyrics were written by WDR employee Henriette Esser. In 2003, Semadar's engagement with WDR ended, and she retired. The last public mention of her was in the Israeli press in connection with a golf tournament in Israel in 2010.

Semadar sang songs especially in Hebrew, Yiddish, Ladino, Portuguese, German, and Russian.

== Selected discography ==
=== Albums ===
- 1964: Af mila al ahava ve-od schloscha schirei ahava, Israel
- 1964: Vis à vis Aviva – Aviva Semadar sings Jewish and other folklore, Klangor
- 1970: Aviva Semadar sings Folklore, SMD Records
- 1978: Aviva Semadar live from the Matinee der Liedersänger/WDR, Eulenspiegel
- 1983: Massel Tow. The luck of songs, Polydor
- 1995: Aviva Semadar sings folklore from around the world, WDR/TMK

=== Compilations ===
- 2008: The Burg Waldeck Festivals 1964–1969: Chansons Folklore International, Bear Family Records (10 CDs with several artists, including Franz Josef Degenhardt, Reinhard Mey, Dieter Süverkrüp, Hannes Wader, Franz Hohler, Odetta, Tangerine Dream)

=== Singles ===
- 1972: Children of the Earth (good God) / Rain, I call mine, SMD Records
- 1975: The carousel of love / I didn't know that before, Supertone
