= Israel Schorr =

American singer

Israel Schorr (1886 - April 9, 1935) was a prominent cantor during the Golden Age of Hazzanut. Born in Khyriv, the Polish region of Galicia then part of the Austro-Hungarian Empire to a Hasidic family, Schorr began his career as a boy, singing soprano in the courts of various Hasidic masters, notably the Rebbe (Grand Rabbi) of Rymanow. In 1904, Schorr replaced his distant relative Hazzan Boruch Schorr as the official cantor for the rebbe of Rymanów.

During World War I, Schorr served in the Imperial army of the Austro-Hungarian Empire. After the war, he took various cantorial posts in central and eastern Europe, including Brno in Czechoslovakia, Kraków in Poland and a brief stint in Zürich, Switzerland. With help from Congressman Sol Bloom of Chicago, Schorr emigrated to the United States in 1924 on an artist's visa to accept a position in Chicago. He later served in cantorial positions in New York City. Some of his family still live in New York, and the city of Boston. Massachusetts. He also performed frequently, including with the cantor Yossele Rosenblatt. Schorr had a baritone voice and in the mid-1920s declined an offer to perform in vaudeville. His father Morris Schorr was also a famous cantor in New York.

Apart from performing the traditional pieces of the Jewish liturgy, Schorr also wrote liturgical pieces. He introduced improvisational lines to the pieces, many of which were later adopted by other prominent cantors. His best-known piece in this style is Sheyibone Beis HaMikdosh, which was modified by Cantor Moshe Koussevitzky.

He was married to Mina Pinczowski Schorr and had two sons and four daughters. Schorr died prematurely of a heart condition in 1935. His son, Morris Schorr, went on to become a cantor in Elizabeth, New Jersey. He was one of the founding members of the Cantor's Assembly.
