= I'm Wearin' My Green Fedora =

"I'm Wearin' My Green Fedora" is a popular song written by songwriters Al Sherman, Al Lewis and Joseph Meyer. It was published in 1934 and is protected by copyright. It was featured in the short animated film My Green Fedora, directed by Friz Freleng and produced by Leon Schlesinger. Chuck Jones and Bob Clampett were the animators. The film was released in the United States on May 4, 1935 and is considered one of the best cartoons featuring a parody of comedic actor Joe Penner.

== The song ==
The song, written by Al Sherman, Al Lewis and Joseph Meyer appears in several other cartoons of the 1930s including "Toy Town Hall" and "The Woods Are Full of Cuckoos".

=== Toy Town Hall ===
This cartoon is six minutes long and is directed by Friz Freleng as well. It was released in the United States on September 19, 1936.

=== The Woods Are Full of Cuckoos ===
This cartoon is seven minutes long and features the voice of Mel Blanc as "Mr. Allen." It was released on December 4, 1937.
