= Tic-tac do Meu Coração =

Song recorded by Carmen Miranda in 1935

Song by Carmen Miranda
- Recorded: 1935
- Songwriters: Alcyr Pires Red; Walfrido Silva

Tic-tac do Meu Coração (English: The Tick Tock of My Heart) is a song written by Alcyr Pires Red and Walfrido Silva and recorded by Carmen Miranda in 1935.

Carmen recorded this song accompanied by the flute of Benedito Lacerda and his music group in the 1930s. It was also presented by Miranda in Springtime in the Rockies (1942). It was such a success that it is still remembered in popular music circles today, and has been revived by singers such as Ney Matogrosso, in the 1980s.
