= Isle of Capri (song) =

1934 song by Will Grosz and Jimmy Kennedy

Single by Ray Noble and His Orchestra, vocal Al Bowlly
- B-side: Grinzing
- Published: July 27, 1934 by Peter Maurice Music Company, Ltd., London, UK
- Released: November 14, 1934
- Recorded: August 30, 1934
- Studio: Abbey Road Studios, London, UK
- Genre: Popular Music, British dance band
- Length: 3:21
- Label: Victor 24771
- Composer(s): Will Grosz
- Lyricist(s): Jimmy Kennedy

"Isle of Capri" is a popular song. The music, a tango foxtrot, was written by Wilhelm Grosz, with lyrics by Jimmy Kennedy and was published in 1934. Ray Noble and his Orchestra with vocalist Al Bowlly, recorded it in London, UK, on August 30, 1934. It was released in November on Victor Records in the United States, reaching number one for seven weeks in early 1935.

Other early recordings:

- Sven-Olov Sandberg made a Swedish translation and recorded it in 1934.
- Lew Stone and his Band with vocal by trumpeter Nat Gonella, recorded on 25 July 1934 and released on Decca (UK) catalogue number F 5132).
- Gracie Fields on 9 October 1934 (HMV B 8232).
- Freddy Martin's orchestra with vocal by Elmer Feldkamp, recorded on 3 December 1934 for Brunswick (catalogue number 7344).
- On 2 February 1935, a Spanish language version of the song by Osvaldo Fresedo with singer Roberto Ray for Victor Records, catalogue number 37725-B.
- Wingy Manone and His Orchestra recorded the song on 8 March 1935 for Vocalion Records (Catalogue No. 2913).

The song was a huge world-wide hit, sung in countless arrangements and translations, including in French by Tino Rossi "C'est à Capri" (1934). Later hit versions were recorded by:

- Frankie Laine in 1952.
- Ken Colyer's Jazzmen recorded the song on 4 November 1953 on their LP 'New Orleans to London'
- Jackie Lee and His Orchestra, released by Coral Records as catalog number 61149, it first reached the Billboard magazine charts on 28 April 1954, and lasted 11 weeks on the chart, peaking at #17.
- The Gaylords released by Mercury Records as catalog number 70350. It first reached the Billboard magazine charts on 5 May 1954 and lasted 10 weeks on the chart, peaking at #15. The flip side, "Love I You", was a minor chart hit.
- Frank Sinatra recorded it on 1 October 1957, for his album: Come Fly with Me, issued in 1958.
- Bing Crosby and Rosemary Clooney included the song in their 1958 album Fancy Meeting You Here.
- Fats Domino recorded it on 15 August 1958.
- Dennis Farnon (with his Orchestra) recorded an instrumental version in 1957 which was released on the RCA Victor record "Caution! Men Swinging" (LSP 1495).
