= Jumbo (musical) =

1935 musical produced by Billy Rose

- Original 1935 Program
- Music: Richard Rodgers
- Lyrics: Lorenz Hart
- Book: Ben Hecht; Charles MacArthur
- Productions: 1935 Broadway; 1962 Film

Jumbo is a musical produced by Billy Rose, with music and lyrics by Richard Rodgers and Lorenz Hart and book by Ben Hecht and Charles MacArthur.

== Production ==
The musical opened on Broadway at the Hippodrome Theatre on November 16, 1935 and closed on April 18, 1936 after 233 performances. Directed by John Murray Anderson and George Abbott it starred Jimmy Durante, Donald Novis, Gloria Grafton, and featured circus specialty acts. Jumbo tells the story of a financially strapped circus. At the end of each performance, Durante lay down on the stage and permitted a live elephant to place its foot upon his head.

The large 5,000-seat theatre was turned into a circus tent where the many specialty acts (including acrobats and animal acts) performed during the show. The music was played by Paul Whiteman and his orchestra.

== Opening night ==
The musicians included as follows:

- Paul Samuel Whiteman, leader
- Mischa Russell, concert master
- Matty Malneck, Harry Struble, Bob Lawrence, violins
- Eddie Wade, Harry Goldfield, Charlie Teagarden, trumpets
- Bill Rank, Jack Teagarden, Hal Matthews, trombones
- Bennie Bonacio, Frank Trumbauer, alto saxophones
- John Baptiste Cordaro, Edward Powell, tenor saxophones
- Charlie Strickfaden, baritone saxophone
- Roy Bargy, piano
- Michael Pingitore, banjo
- Artie Miller, bass
- Norman McPherson, tuba
- Larry Gomerdinger, drums and percussion

== Songs ==
Act 1

- Over and Over Again – Mr. Ball and Henderson's Razorbacks
- The Circus Is on Parade – Henderson's Razorbacks and Artists of the Circus
- The Most Beautiful Girl in the World – Matt Mulligan Jr. and Mickey Considine
- Laugh – Claudius B. Bowers and Circus Specialty
- My Romance – Matt Mulligan Jr. and Mickey Considine
- Little Girl Blue – Mickey Considine

Act 2

- The Song of the Roustabouts – The Razorbacks
- Women –Claudius B. Bowers, Circus Specialty, Allan K. Foster Girls and Dancers
- Memories of Madison Square Garden (When the Circus Played the Garden) – Ensemble
- Diavolo – Mr. Ball, The Razorbacks and Circus Specialties
- The Circus Wedding – Entire Company and The Menagerie

Note:The song "There's a Small Hotel", dropped from the production before it opened, later appeared in the 1936 Rodgers and Hart musical On Your Toes and became a standard.

== 1962 film ==
The musical was made into a movie as Billy Rose's Jumbo in 1962, starring Jimmy Durante, Doris Day, Martha Raye, and Stephen Boyd, featuring Busby Berkeley's choreography. It was nominated for the Academy Award for Best Scoring of Music-Adaptation or Treatment. Although Jimmy Durante was in the cast of both the stage musical and the film (made nearly three decades later), the two productions have very different plots, using much of the same score, and the characters' names were changed in the film. However, one piece of stage business from the stage musical was repeated in the film: In both versions, Durante is working for a cash-strapped circus when its assets are seized by creditors. Durante attempts to sneak his beloved elephant Jumbo off the circus grounds, only to be confronted by a sheriff, who demands: "Where you going with that elephant?" Caught red-handed, Durante blithely replies "What elephant?"
