= Marcelle de Manziarly =

French pianist

Marcelle de Manziarly (13 October 1899 – 12 May 1989) was a French pianist, music educator, conductor and composer.

== Biography ==
She was born on 13 October 1899 in Kharkiv, studied in Paris with Nadia Boulanger and at the age of 23 had already composed two mature works. She later studied conducting with Felix Weingartner in Basel and piano with Isabelle Vengerova in New York City and taught and performed in Europe and the United States. Aaron Copland dedicated his song "Heart, We Will Forget Him" to her. She died in Ojai, California, at age 89.

== Works ==
Selected works include:

- Trois Fables de Lafontaine (1935)
- Six Etudes (pour Piano)
- Trois Images Slaves
- Impressions de Mer
- Sonate pour Notre-Dame de Paris for orchestra
- Sonata for two pianos
- Musique pour orchestre
- Trilogue
- Incidences
- La cigale et la fourmi (in Trois Fables de La Fontaine) (Text: Jean de La Fontaine) (1935)
- La grenouille qui veut se faire aussi grosse que le boeuf (in Trois Fables de La Fontaine) (Text: Jean de La Fontaine) (1935)
- L'oiseau blessé d'une flèche (in Trois Fables de La Fontaine) (Text: Jean de La Fontaine) (1935)
- Le Cygne et le cuisinier (Text: Jean de La Fontaine) for mixed vocal quartet and piano (1959)
- Trois Sonnets de Pétrarque pour baryton et piano (Texts : Petrarca) (1958 to 1960)
