= John Oddo =

American musical artist (1953–2019)

- John Oddo at piano, circa 2005

Background information
- Born: John Frank Oddo; March 21, 1953; Brooklyn, New York
- Died: April 2, 2019 (aged 66) White Plains, New York
- Genres: Jazz
- Occupations: Musician, composer, arranger
- Instrument: Piano
- Label: Concord

John Frank Oddo (March 21, 1953 – April 2, 2019) was an American jazz pianist, composer, and arranger. He is most notably associated as pianist and musical director for Woody Herman, Rosemary Clooney and Michael Feinstein.

== Early life ==
John Oddo was born in Brooklyn, New York on March 21, 1953. He studied piano as a child and would eventually graduate from the Eastman School of Music with a master's degree in Jazz Studies in 1978.

== Career ==
=== Woody Herman's Young Thundering Herd ===
I think it's the best big-band album in terms of sound that I've been associated with in the last 46 years. (re: Live at the Concord Jazz Festival LP)

— Woody Herman

By 1980 the pipeline of young musicians coming out of the Eastman School of Music had become a strong stream of young jazz artists for Woody Herman's big band. Recently graduated from Eastman, on July 6 of 1980 Oddo joined the Herman organization along with John Fedchock, Steve Harrow and Mike Brignola. Oddo would quickly become a star in the long line of pianists/arrangers for Herman dating back to Ralph Burns, Nat Pierce and Alan Broadbent; he would serve as the band's primary arranger 1980-1984. Two notable albums with Concord Records were produced during this time featuring Oddo as both pianist and musical arranger/director: The Woody Herman Big Band Live at the Concord Jazz Festival (1981) and World Class (1982, live from Osaka, Japan). Both of these Concord releases would go on to earn Grammy Award nominations in 1982 and 1984 for Best Jazz Performance – Large Group (Instrumental). John Oddo has become synonymous with the long list of notable Herman composers and arrangers to include names such as Johnny Mandel, Bill Holman, Shorty Rogers, Jimmy Guiffre and others.

=== Rosemary Clooney ===
She (Clooney) is very definite about what she does," he said. "She has a reason for singing everything she sings, and I try to bring that out in an arrangement. One reason we work together so well is that she's basically a swing singer, and I'm rooted in that style.

— John Oddo

In August 1983, Woody Herman recorded the album My Buddy featuring Rosemary Clooney on the Concord Records label. Carl Jefferson (CEO with Concord) urged the collaboration as both Clooney and Herman were on contract with his label at the time; this being her eighth and his sixth release with Concord. John Oddo served as the arranger and musical director of the project having been serving in that role for the Herman band for the previous two and a half years. Three new arrangements (of Oddo's seven) were literally produced overnight by him for the new project. The album is the start of a long, 18-year association of Oddo becoming Clooney's musical director; the musical architect of her resurgence in popularity. His credits include work on 20 of her recordings, as well as numerous live and televised performances.

=== Michael Feinstein ===
Oddo was a longtime collaborator with Michael Feinstein as both music director and arranger, and received a Drama Desk Award nomination for his orchestrations for Feinstein and Dame Edna Everage's 2010 Broadway show, All About Me. Oddo was also musical director for Feinstein's PBS specials, Michael Feinstein at the Rainbow Room and Michael Feinstein New Year's Eve at the Rainbow Room. Starting in 2010, Oddo appeared and is heard on numerous episodes of Michael Feinstein's PBS series American Songbook.

=== Further work ===
Over his career, John Oddo became the "go-to guy" for an arrangement, orchestration or backing singers in the New York entertainment circles for regular engagements, Broadway and broadcast media to include the famous Algonquin Hotel Oak Room. In the early 1980s Oddo worked for the group Dameronia helping to transcribe and recreate the music of Tadd Dameron for concerts and three notable recordings. As musical director, arranger and pianist Oddo's musical collaborators over the years have included Debby Boone, Stan Getz, Patti Austin, Joe Williams, Christine Ebersole, Melissa Errico, Tony Bennett, Ray Charles, Bob Hope, Toni Tennille, Maureen McGovern, David Hyde Pierce, Linda Ronstadt, John Pizzarelli, and Steve Tyrell. He served as musical director and arranger for James Naughtons production Street of Dreams in 1998 and PBS "Live from Lincoln Center" presents James Naughton: The Songs of Randy Newman. Other notable projects included composer and performer for the 2003 PBS/Showtime Our Town directed by James Naughton. He served as, conductor, pianist, and arranger for the NBC special Scott Hamilton & Friends. Oddo has performed at the White House for four presidents. From 2015 to 2019 Oddo served as the musical director, arranger and pianist for Tony Danza's cabaret show, Standards & Stories.

== Personal life ==
John Oddo died suddenly at his home in White Plains, New York, on April 2, 2019.

== Discography ==
With Debby Boone

- 2005: Reflections of Rosemary (Concord)

With Rosemary Clooney

- 1984 Rosemary Clooney Sings the Music of Irving Berlin (Concord)
- 1985 Rosemary Clooney Sings Ballads (Concord)
- 1986 Rosemary Clooney Sings the Music of Jimmy Van Heusen (Concord)
- 1987 Rosemary Clooney Sings the Lyrics of Johnny Mercer (Concord)
- 1989 Show Tunes (Concord)
- 1990 Rosemary Clooney Sings Rodgers, Hart & Hammerstein (Concord)
- 1991 For the Duration (Concord)
- 1992 Girl Singer (Concord)
- 1993 Do You Miss New York? (Concord)
- 1994 Still on the Road (Concord)
- 1995 Demi-Centennial (Concord)
- 1996 Dedicated to Nelson (Concord)
- 1996 White Christmas
- 1997 Mothers & Daughters
- 1998 At Long Last (with the Count Basie Orchestra)
- 2000 Brazil (with John Pizzarelli)
- 2001 Sentimental Journey: The Girl Singer and Her New Big Band
- 2002 The Last Concert (live)
- 2008 Sings for Lovers (Concord)

With Dameronia

- 1982 To Tadd with Love (Uptown)
- 1983 Look Stop Listen (Uptown)
- 1989 Live at the Theatre Boulogne (Soul Note)

With Melissa Errico

- 2018 Sondheim Sublime (Ghostlight Records)

With Oleg Frish

- 2015 Duets with My American Idols

With Michael Feinstein

- 2000 Romance on Film, Romance on Broadway (Concord)
- 2002 The Michael Feinstein Anthology
- 2009 The Power of Two
- 2011 We Dreamed These Days
- 2011 Cheek to Cheek: Cook and Feinstein

With Woody Herman

- 1982 Live at the Concord Jazz Festival (Concord)
- 1983 My Buddy (Concord)
- 1984 World Class (Concord)
- 2002 From East to West (Concord) - two album set
- 2004/1981 Live in Chicago

With Maureen McGovern

- 1996: Out of This World

With Rosie O'Donnell

- 1999 A Rosie Christmas

With Laura Osnes

- 2016 Hallelujah!

With Richard Stoltzman

- 1991 Ebony (RCA)

With Steve Tyrell

- 2013 It's Magic: The Songs of Sammy Cahn (Concord)

With Rufus Wainwright

- 2007 Rufus Does Judy at Carnegie Hall (Geffen)

With Tom Wopat

- 2011 Consider It Swung
- 2012 I've Got Your Number
- 2014 Home For Christmas (Distribution 13)

== Film and television ==
- Michael Feinstein in Concert (1989)
- Golden Anniversary (1995)
- Our Town (2003)
- An Evening with Scott Hamilton & Friends (2004)
- Michael Feinstein at the Rainbow Room (2014)
- "Live from Lincoln Center": James Naughton: The Songs of Randy Newman (2014)

== Awards and nominations ==
Year	Award	Category	Work	Result
2010	Drama Desk Award	Outstanding Orchestrations	All About Me	Nominated

== See also ==
- List of jazz arrangers
