= Joe Porcaro =

American jazz drummer (1930–2020)

- Born: Joseph Thomas Porcaro; April 29, 1930; New Britain, Connecticut, U.S.
- Died: July 6, 2020 (aged 90) Thousand Oaks, California, U.S.
- Genres: Jazz
- Occupations: Musician; educator
- Instruments: Drums; percussion
- Spouse: Eileen Linnell

Joseph Thomas Porcaro (April 29, 1930 – July 6, 2020) was an American jazz drummer.

== Biography ==
=== Personal life ===
The Porcaro family is, on the paternal side, originally from San Luca, an Aspromonte village in the province of Reggio Calabria, in Calabria, Italy. Joe Porcaro was born in Hartford, Connecticut. Joe’s father was himself a percussionist who played with numerous Italian bands based in Italy and the U.S., and it is with him that the family musical tradition began, passed on to his son Joe and then to his three famous grandchildren. Joe's three sons were in the rock band Toto: drummer Jeff (1954–1992); bassist Mike (1955–2015); and keyboardist Steve (b. 1957), who still is a session musician and programmer. Joe also has a daughter, Joleen Porcaro Duddy (actress and designer), whose children, Chase and Paige Duddy, formed the electronic duo XYLO.

=== Career ===
Porcaro recorded with Natalie Cole, Don Ellis, Stan Getz, Freddie Hubbard, Gladys Knight, Madonna, The Monkees, Gerry Mulligan, Pink Floyd, Howard Roberts, Frank Sinatra, Nancy Sinatra, and Sarah Vaughan. He performed film scores with James Newton Howard, John Williams, Jerry Goldsmith, James Horner, Alan Silvestri, Danny Elfman, John Frizzell and his son Steve Porcaro. With educator and drummer Ralph Humphrey, he was one of the founders of the Los Angeles Music Academy (LAMA) in Pasadena, California, which is now called the Los Angeles College of Music (LACM). Porcaro led a group with Emil Richards, a native of Hartford who played vibraphone and collected percussion instruments from around the world.

=== Death ===
Porcaro died at the age of 90 in Thousand Oaks, California, on July 6, 2020. His death was ruled to be of natural causes.

== Discography ==
=== As leader ===
- 2002 Better Off Back Then

=== As sideman ===
With Rosemary Clooney

- 1992 Girl Singer
- 1994 Still on the Road
- 1995 Demi-Centennial
- 1996 Dedicated to Nelson
- 1997 Mothers & Daughters
- 2002 Out of This World

With Lalo Schifrin

- The Fox (MGM, 1968)
- There's a Whole Lalo Schifrin Goin' On (Dot, 1968)
- Kelly's Heroes (MGM, 1970)
- Rock Requiem (Verve, 1971)
- Enter the Dragon (Warner Bros., 1973)

With Toto

- Turn Back (Columbia, 1981)
- Toto IV (Columbia, 1982)
- Isolation (Columbia, 1984)
- Fahrenheit (Columbia, 1986)
- The Seventh One (Columbia, 1988)
- Kingdom of Desire (Realitivity, 1992)

With others

- 1962 Blues on the Other Side, Mike Mainieri (Argo)
- 1967 Sugar, Nancy Sinatra
- 1968 California Soul, Gerald Wilson
- 1969 Instant Replay, The Monkees
- 1970 The American Dream, Emitt Rhodes
- 1971 Electronic Progress, Harvey Mandel
- 1971 The Age of Steam, Gerry Mulligan
- 1972 Sunshine Day, The McCrarys
- 1973 Love Has Got Me, Wendy Waldman
- 1973 Emerge, The McCrarys
- 1974 150 MPH, Louie Bellson
- 1974 She's Gone, Lou Rawls
- 1975 Home Plate, Bonnie Raitt
- 1975 John R. Cash, Johnny Cash
- 1975 Mirrors, Peggy Lee
- 1975 Touch, John Klemmer
- 1976 Barefoot Ballet, John Klemmer
- 1976 Silk Degrees, Boz Scaggs
- 1977 Southern Nights, Glen Campbell
- 1977 Making a Good Thing Better, Olivia Newton-John
- 1977 White Shadows, Tim Moore
- 1978 Change of Heart, Eric Carmen
- 1978 Cheryl Lynn, Cheryl Lynn
- 1978 Just in Time, The Singers Unlimited
- 1978 Voyager, Karen Alexander
- 1979 Raw Silk, Randy Crawford
- 1979 Yvonne, Yvonne Elliman
- 1979 Headlines, Paul Anka
- 1979 Children of the World, Stan Getz
- 1981 Big Mouth, Milt Jackson
- 1981 Messina, Jim Messina
- 1981 Songs of The Beatles, Sarah Vaughan
- 1981 Rit, Lee Ritenour
- 1982 Donna Summer, Donna Summer
- 1982 Ride Like the Wind, Freddie Hubbard
- 1984 Emotion, Barbra Streisand
- 1987 Freedom at Midnight, David Benoit
- 1987 Russ Taff, Russ Taff
- 1988 Mel Tormé and the Marty Paich Dektette – Reunion, Mel Tormé
- 1989 Like a Prayer, Madonna
- 1989 Let It Go, Clair Marlo
- 1991 Showstoppers, Barry Manilow
- 1993 Devotion, Warren Hill
- 1993 When My Heart Finds Christmas, Harry Connick Jr.
- 1993 Windows, Roger Kellaway
- 1996 Luntana, Emil Richards
- 1996 Organic, Joe Cocker
- 1997 Conspiracy Theory, Carter Burwell
- 1997 Tribute to Jeff Porcaro, David Garfield
- 2004 The Dana Owens Album, Queen Latifah
- 2005 Christmas Songs, Diana Krall
- 2006 Before Me, Gladys Knight
