= Guy Lombardo's Diamond Jubilee =

American TV musical series (1956)

- Written by: Gordon Auchincloss
- Directed by: Charles S. Dubin
- Starring: Guy Lombardo
- Music by: Guy Lombardo and His Royal Canadians
- Country of origin: United States

Production
- Executive producer: Mort Abrahams
- Producer: Gordon Auchincloss

Original release
- Network: CBS
- Release: March 20 – June 19, 1956

Guy Lombardo's Diamond Jubilee is an American musical television program that was broadcast on CBS from March 20, 1956, until June 19, 1956.

== Format ==
Guy Lombardo and His Royal Canadians orchestra played music, joined by Lombardo's brothers Carmen, Lebert, and Victor. Elise Rhodes was the female vocalist.

In what CBS described as "a completely new and novel idea in television entertainment", the format put less emphasis than usual on music and more on talk. The New York Times noted prior to the show's debut, "This format is a departure for Mr. Lombardo, who has said that his past TV success resulted from the fact that his show simply offered dance music and no theatrical superfluities."

Viewer participation was part of the show via a Song of Your Life contest that had viewers submitting comments about how a particular song had affected their lives. Winners received a free trip to New York to appear on an episode in which the orchestra played that special song. Each of four winners per episode received a $1000 diamond ring, (the basis for the show's title), and other gifts. Winners whose entries were accompanied by a Geritol box top received an additional $1000. Celebrities also appeared as guests, explaining the importance of certain songs in their lives. They included George DeWitt, Tommy Dorsey, Cornell Wilde and Jean Wallace.

== Production ==
Broadcast live from New York, Guy Lombardo's Diamond Jubilee was seen on Tuesdays from 9 to 9:30 p.m. Eastern Time, replacing Meet Millie. It originated from WCBS-TV in New York City. Mort Abrahams was the executive producer, with Gordon Auchincloss as producer and writer. Charles S. Dubin was the director. Pharmaceuticals, Incorporated was the sponsor. The show's competition included Make Room for Daddy on ABC and Fireside Theatre on NBC. It was replaced by Joe and Mabel.

== Critical response ==
J. P. Shanley, in a review in The New York Times, said that the program "offered a minimum of Lombardo music and a series of awkward interviews with letter writers". He described Lombardo as being "painfully ill at ease" during the interviews and summarized the program as "synthetic nonsense".

Radio-TV editor Jack E. Anderson of The Miami Herald described the premiere episode of Guy Lombardo's Diamond Jubilee as "just about the most plodding, uninspired network effort this season." He added that Lombardo had little talent for being a master of ceremonies. Anderson acknowledged that he was not a fan of Lombardo and his music but said, "quite apart from whether you like Lombardo's music, the money being spent for the show should have produced a heck of a lot better entertainment."

A review in the trade publication Motion Picture Daily described the show's episodes as "half-hour segments chock full not only of sweet, sentimental music, but also of sweet, sentimental stories." It complimented the music but said, "The quality of the show is not high" and commented, "Mr. Lombardo seems somewhat bored by the proceedings, perhaps knowing that he has his audience ready-made, no matter how foolish the format or how tired the blood."
