= Dan Higgins =

American saxophone and woodwind player

Dan Higgins is an American saxophone and woodwind player.

== Education ==
Higgins graduated from North Texas State University.

== Career ==
He has worked with such artists as John Williams, Seth MacFarlane, Aerosmith, Stevie Wonder, Neil Diamond, Al Jarreau, Maroon 5, Kenny Loggins, Barry Manilow, Elton John, Go West, The Temptations, Lionel Richie, Joe Cocker, Luis Miguel, Lisa Stansfield, and Eros Ramazzotti. He has over 800 motion picture soundtracks to his credit. He is also known as the saxophone sound of Bleeding Gums Murphy from The Simpsons.

== Collaborations ==
- The Rumour - Olivia Newton-John (1988)
- Back to Avalon - Kenny Loggins (1988)
- The Real Me - Patti Austin (1988)
- The Best Years of Our Lives - Neil Diamond (1988)
- As Good as It Gets - Deniece Williams (1988)
- Heart's Horizon - Al Jarreau (1988)
- Back of My Mind - Christopher Cross (1988)
- Oasis - Roberta Flack (1988)
- Land of Dreams - Randy Newman (1988)
- Home - Stephanie Mills (1989)
- Heart of Stone - Cher (1989)
- Making Every Moment Count - Peter Allen (1990)
- Pure Schuur - Diane Schuur (1991)
- Discipline - Desmond Child (1991)
- Time, Love & Tenderness - Michael Bolton (1991)
- Unforgettable... with Love - Natalie Cole (1991)
- Real Love - Lisa Stansfield (1991)
- In Tribute - Diane Schuur (1992)
- Girl Singer - Rosemary Clooney (1992)
- Rendezvous - Christopher Cross (1992)
- Timeless: The Classics - Michael Bolton (1992)
- Heaven and Earth - Al Jarreau (1992)
- Duets - Elton John (1993)
- Wagamama na Actress - Miho Nakayama (1993)
- Soul Talkin' - Brenda Russell (1993)
- Still on the Road - Rosemary Clooney (1994)
- Timepiece - Kenny Rogers (1994)
- Rhythm of Love - Anita Baker (1994)
- That Secret Place - Patti Austin (1994)
- Dreaming of You - Selena (1995)
- One Clear Voice - Peter Cetera (1995)
- Mid Blue - Miho Nakayama (1995)
- White Christmas - Rosemary Clooney (1996)
- This Is The Time: The Christmas Album - Michael Bolton (1996)
- Across from Midnight - Joe Cocker (1997)
- Lisa Stansfield - Lisa Stansfield (1997)
- Songs from a Parent to a Child - Art Garfunkel (1997)
- Manilow Sings Sinatra - Barry Manilow (1998)
- I Wanna Be Santa Claus - Ringo Starr (1999)
- A Christmas to Remember - Amy Grant (1999)
- A Merry Little Christmas - Linda Ronstadt (2000)
- Love, Shelby - Shelby Lynne (2001)
- Swing When You're Winning - Robbie Williams (2001)
- Cry - Faith Hill (2002)
- All I Got - Al Jarreau (2002)
- It Had to Be You: The Great American Songbook - Rod Stewart (2002)
- The Movie Album - Barbra Streisand (2003)
- Ringo Rama - Ringo Starr (2003)
- Bette Midler Sings the Peggy Lee Songbook - Bette Midler (2003)
- The Evening of My Best Day - Rickie Lee Jones (2003)
- Leave the Light On - Beth Hart (2003)
- Heavier Things - John Mayer (2003)
- Midnight - Diane Schuur (2003)
- My Everything - Anita Baker (2004)
- What a Wonderful World - LeAnn Rimes (2004)
- A Christmas Album - James Taylor (2004)
- Rock Swings - Paul Anka (2005)
- It's Time - Michael Bublé (2005)
- How the Mighty Fall - Mark Owen (2005)
- Cool Yule - Bette Midler (2005)
- James Taylor at Christmas - James Taylor (2006)
- Bring It On Home... The Soul Classics - Aaron Neville (2006)
- Miss Patti's Christmas - Patti LaBelle (2007)
- Home Before Dark - Neil Diamond (2008)
- No Regrets - Randy Crawford (2008)
- One of the Boys - Katy Perry (2008)
- Still Unforgettable - Natalie Cole (2008)
- Harps and Angels - Randy Newman (2008)
- Patrizio - Patrizio Buanne (2009)
- Skylark - Renee Olstead (2009)
- The Boy Who Knew Too Much - Mika (2009)
- Congo Square - Teena Marie (2009)
- Brian Wilson Reimagines Gershwin - Brian Wilson (2010)
- When Ronan Met Burt - Ronan Keating (2011)
- What Matters Most - Barbra Streisand (2011)
- Soul 2 - Seal (2011)
- Christmas - Michael Bublé (2011)
- Guitar Man - George Benson (2011)
- Almería (deluxe edition) – Lifehouse (2012)
- Someday - Susanna Hoffs (2012)
- To Be Loved - Michael Bublé (2013)
- Paradise Valley - John Mayer (2013)
- Storytone - Neil Young (2014)
- Seven - Lisa Stansfield (2014)
- It's the Girls! - Bette Midler (2014)
- The Search for Everything - John Mayer (2017)
- Dark Matter - Randy Newman (2017)
- Love - Michael Bublé (2018)
- Deeper - Lisa Stansfield (2018)
- It's the Holiday Season - Martina McBride (2018)

== See also ==
- Catch Me If You Can (soundtrack)

== Links ==
- Dan Higgins' personal web
