= Rambling 'Round Radio Row =

1932 film

- Directed by: Jerry Wald
- Written by: Jerry Wald
- Produced by: Jerry Wald
- Starring: "see Cast"
- Cinematography: Edwin B. DuPar
- Distributed by: Vitaphone/Warner Brothers
- Release dates: 1932; 1933; 1934
- Running time: 9 minutes
- Country: United States
- Language: English

Rambling 'Round Radio Row (1932–1934) is a series of short subjects, produced by Jerry Wald, and released by the Vitaphone division of Warner Brothers. The final film in the series, released 1934, was #3 of the second season, and starred Morton Downey, Baby Rose Marie, The Harmoniacs, and Harriet Lee.

== Cast ==
(The numbers indicate the Vitaphone catalog number on the film each appeared in. See next section below.)

- Roy Atwell (#1664)
- Harry Barris (#1447)
- Smith Ballew (#1453)
- Bon Bon (#1473)
- Betty Boon (#1662)
- Boswell Sisters (#1408)
- Eddie Bruce (#1632)
- Nat Brusiloff (#1408)
- Don Carney (#1473)
- Harry Lew Conrad (#1473)
- Jack Denny (#1453)
- Patsy Flick (#1662)
- Jay C. Flippen (#1452)
- Edna Froos (#1447)
- Sylvia Froos (#1408 & 1447)
- The Funnyboners (#1453)
- John "Slim" Furness (#1473)
- Tess Gardella (#1452)
- Sid Gary (#1408)
- Tito Guizar (#1474 & 1632)
- William Hall (#1452)
- The Happiness Boys (#1453)
- The Harmoniacs (#1664)
- Frank Hazzard (#1474)
- Fletcher Henderson
- Shemp Howard (#1662)
- Shirley Howard (#1632)
- Ted Husing (#1447)
- Art Jarrett (#1447)
- George Jessel (#1662)
- Bennie Krueger (#1447)
- Burton Lane (#1447)
- Frances Langford (#1453)
- Howard Lanin Orchestra (#1452)
- Harriet Lee (singer) (#1473 & 1664)
- Ann Leaf (#1474)
- Welcome Lewis (#1452)
- Carmen Lombardo (#1452)
- Guy Lombardo (#1452)
- Lebert Lombardo (#1452)
- Victor Lombardo (#1452)
- Abe Lyman (#1408)
- Johnny Marvin (#1452)
- Men About Town (#1632)
- Jack Miller, Jr. (#1408)
- Ozzie Nelson & Harriet Hilliard
- The Nitwits (vaudeville group)
- Frank Novak, Jr. (#1664)
- Ted Pearson (actor) (#1474)
- Bob Pease (#1473)
- The Pickens Sisters (#1474)
- Bonnie Poe
- Ramon & Rosita (#1662)
- Reis & Dunn (#1453)
- Alan Reed (#1632)
- Jaques Renard (#1453)
- Freddie Rich (#1453)
- Buddy Rogers (#1473)
- Rose Marie (#1452 & 1664)
- Harry Rose (#1473)
- Teddy Seco (#1662)
- Kate Smith (#1408)
- Stoopnagle and Budd (#1408)
- The Three Keys (#1473)
- Arthur Tracy (#1453)
- Vera Van (#1662)
- Jane Vance (#1452)
- Jerry Wald (#1408, 1447, 1453, 1473 & 1474)
- Loyce Whiteman (#1447)
- Paul Whiteman & his Rhythm Boys (#1474)
- Rudy Wiedoeft (#1447)
- Lee Wiley (#1452)
- Lois Wilson

== List of shorts ==
(listed by Vitaphone numbers since actual title numbers varied)

- Rambling 'Round Radio Row - Vitaphone #1408 / #1, June 25, 1932 (FILM DAILY review)
- Rambling 'Round Radio Row - Vitaphone #1447 / #2, October 22, 1932
- Rambling 'Round Radio Row - Vitaphone #1452 / #4 (also listed as 3), March 24, 1933 (filmed July 1932)
- Rambling 'Round Radio Row - Vitaphone #1453 / #5 (also listed as 4), June 7, 1933 (filmed September 1932)
- Rambling 'Round Radio Row - Vitaphone #1473 / #6 (also listed as 5), April 29, 1933 (MOTION PICTURE HERALD review, filmed July 1932)
- Rambling 'Round Radio Row - Vitaphone #1474 / #7 (also listed as 6), June 1933 (filmed September 1932)
- Rambling 'Round Radio Row - Vitaphone #1632 / #3 (also listed as 2-1), October 1933
- Rambling 'Round Radio Row - Vitaphone #1662 / #1 (also listed as season #3), June 16, 1934
- Rambling 'Round Radio Row - Vitaphone #1664 / #8 (also listed as 2-2), May 19, 1934

== Notes ==
The series is available on DVD in the Warner Brothers 6-DVD set Big Band, Jazz & Swing Short Subject Collection.

== See also ==
- List of short subjects by Hollywood studio § Warner Brothers
- Pepper Pots (Often this series was listed by this umbrella title in trade magazines.)
