= Kenny Gardner =

American singer

- Born: Kenneth A. Gardner; March 20, 1913; Lake View, Iowa, U.S.
- Died: July 26, 2002 (aged 89); Manhasset, New York, U.S.
- Occupations: Singer, actor
- Years active: 1936–1978
- Known for: Royal Canadians
- Spouse: Elaine Lombardo (m. 1942; died 1999)

Kenneth A. Gardner (March 20, 1913 – July 26, 2002) was an American singer for Guy Lombardo's band the Royal Canadians.

== Early years ==
Kenneth A. Gardner was born on March 20, 1913, in Lake View, Iowa, the eldest son of Norman and May Chambers Gardner. He had two younger brothers, Robert and Edward. During his teens, Kenny went to Neligh, Nebraska, to live with an aunt and uncle. He attended Creighton University and had part-time jobs at a movie theater and a mortuary. He later moved to California and attended San Diego State College, where he studied engineering.

== Career ==
Gardner was singing on radio as early as 1936, when he was among those appearing on an episode of California Hour. In 1946–47, he was the male singer on Easy Does It, a quarter-hour daily daytime variety program on the Mutual Broadcasting System. In 1941, he voiced the role of "Dick" in the animated comedy film, Mr. Bug Goes to Town. He also sang "Where Do We Go From Here" in the film, which was written by Percy Wenrich.

Gardner joined the Royal Canadians in 1940 and would sing such signature Lombardo tunes as "Frankie and Johnny" and "Enjoy Yourself (It's Later than You Think)" in the smooth but lively and cheerful manner that Lombardo required. According to Gardner, Lombardo once stopped him from taking music lessons because it was "changing the style of the band". He took time out from the band to serve in World War II, where he was wounded and earned two Purple Hearts. After retiring in 1978, a year after Guy Lombardo died, Gardner became more involved in local activities in the Plandome, New York, area.

== Personal life ==
Gardner married Elaine Lombardo, Guy's sister, in 1942, they remained married until her death in 1999. Gardner died from a heart attack on July 26, 2002, at his residence in Manhasset, New York, following an appendectomy.

== See also ==
- Carmen Lombardo
- Guy Lombardo
- Lebert Lombardo
- Victor Lombardo
