= There Won't Be a Shortage of Love =

"There Won't Be a Shortage of Love" is a 1942 popular song written by Carmen Lombardo and John Jacob Loeb. The song was written in response to the rationing of goods in the United States in the Second World War. The song was first recorded by Dolly Dawn and her Dawn Patrol Orchestra. Subsequent versions were recorded by Guy Lombardo, Benny Goodman, Teddy Powell, and Kay Kyser. Goodman's version featured Peggy Lee on vocals and was arranged by pianist Mel Powell. Goodman and Lee's version was not issued as a single and was first released on the 1999 boxset Peggy Lee & Benny Goodman - The Complete Recordings.

Lombardo and Loeb's follow-up song "There's No Ceiling on Love" concerned price controls imposed by the Office of Price Administration.

In March 1942 Billboard reviewed Guy Lombardo's recording saying that it was the "first of the rationing songs of which many more are undoubtedly in the offering" and that it "comes at just the right time to give assurance to lovers". It was released as the B-side to "How Do I Know It's Real?" on Decca Records.

It was alleged in May 1942 by songwriters Frank Capano and Harry Filler that "There Won't Be a Shortage of Love" was too derivative of their song "Smokes For Yanks".
