= The Last Concert =

The Last Concert may refer to:

- The Complete Last Concert, an album by the Modern Jazz Quartet
- The Last Concert (Rosemary Clooney album), 2002
- Take All of Me, a 1976 film also known as The Last Concert
- Selena Live! The Last Concert, an album by Selena
