= Seems Like Old Times =

"Seems Like Old Times" can refer to:

- Seems Like Old Times (film), a 1980 comedy starring Chevy Chase, Goldie Hawn, and Charles Grodin
- "Seems Like Old Times" (song), a popular song, theme of Arthur Godfrey's radio programs. Co-written by Carmen Lombardo
