= At Long Last =

Studio album by Rosemary Clooney
- Released: October 13, 1998
- Recorded: November 1997 – June 1998
- Genre: Vocal jazz
- Length: 61:30
- Label: Concord
- Producer: John Burk

Rosemary Clooney chronology
Mothers & Daughters (1998)	At Long Last (1998)	Brazil (2000)

Professional ratings
Review scores
Source	Rating
AllMusic	3/5 stars

At Long Last is a 1998 studio album by Rosemary Clooney, accompanied by the Count Basie Orchestra. This was Clooney's first recording with the Basie band. Clooney had previously made an album with Duke Ellington, Blue Rose in 1956. Fourteen years after Count Basie's death, the Count Basie Orchestra is featured here as a ghost band, led by Grover Mitchell.

== Track listing ==
1. "Just in Time" (Betty Comden, Adolph Green, Jule Styne) – 2:52
2. "Like Someone in Love" (Burke, Jimmy Van Heusen) – 3:51
3. "Willow Weep for Me" (Ann Ronell) – 4:22
4. "Lullaby of Broadway" (Al Dubin, Harry Warren) – 3:18
5. "Old Devil Moon" (Yip Harburg, Burton Lane) – 4:00
6. "Everything Happens to Me" (Tom Adair, Matt Dennis) – 4:45
7. "I Want to Be a Sideman" (Dave Frishberg) – 4:04
8. "In the Wee Small Hours of the Morning" (Bob Hilliard, Dave Mann) – 3:54
9. "How About You?" (Ralph Freed, Burton Lane) – 3:04
10. "The Man That Got Away" (Harold Arlen, Ira Gershwin) – 5:51
11. "Seems Like Old Times" (John Jacob Loeb, Carmen Lombardo) – 2:38
12. "Guess I'll Hang My Tears Out to Dry" (Sammy Cahn, Styne) – 4:19
13. "It Just Happened to Happen to Me" (Nick Clooney) – 2:51
14. "I Got Rhythm" (George Gershwin, I. Gershwin) – 4:08
15. "The Gypsy in My Soul" (Clay Boland, Moe Jaffe) – 3:40
16. "If Swing Goes, I Go Too" (Fred Astaire, Warren) – 3:53

== Personnel ==
- Rosemary Clooney – vocal
- Barry Manilow – vocal on "How About You"
- The Count Basie Orchestra
