= The Wonderful Year =

The Wonderful Year may refer to:

- The Wonderfull Yeare, 1603 pamphlet by English writer Thomas Dekker
- The Wonderful Year (film), 1921 British silent film directed by Kenelm Foss
- The Wonderful Year (novel), 1946 American children's novel by Nancy Barnes

== See also ==
- A Wonderful Year, 1966 American album/LP by Guy Lombardo
- The Wonderful Years, 1980 West German film directed by Reiner Kunze
