= A Night at the Roosevelt with Guy Lombardo & His Royal Canadians =

A Night At The Roosevelt With Guy Lombardo & His Royal Canadians

Studio album by Guy Lombardo
- Released: 1954
- Label: Decca

Guy Lombardo chronology
Guy Lombardo Presents Arabian Nights (1954)	A Night At The Roosevelt With Guy Lombardo & His Royal Canadians (1954)	Lombardoland USA (1955)

A Night at the Roosevelt with Guy Lombardo—and His Royal Canadians is a long-playing record album (LP) issued by Decca Records in the United States in 1954.

== Track listing ==
Side 1

1. Sweet Sue, Just You
2. Whistling in the Dark,
3. The Petite Waltz,
4. Lombardo Medley #1,
5. Managua-Nicaragua,
6. From This Moment On,

Side 2

1. Did You Ever See a Dream Walking?,
2. I Want a Girl (Just Like the Girl That Married Dear Old Dad),
3. Japansy,
4. Lombardo Medley #2,
5. No Can Do,
6. The Most Beautiful Girl in the World
