= Show Tunes (album) =

Studio album by Rosemary Clooney
- Released: 1988
- Recorded: 1988
- Genre: Jazz
- Length: 49:12
- Label: Concord
- Producer: John Burk

Rosemary Clooney chronology
Rosemary Clooney Sings the Lyrics of Johnny Mercer (1987)	Show Tunes (1988)	Rosemary Clooney Sings Rodgers, Hart & Hammerstein (1989)

Professional ratings
Review scores
Source	Rating
AllMusic	3/5 stars
Stereo Review	splendid

Show Tunes is a 1989 album of show tunes by Rosemary Clooney.

== Track listing ==
1. "I Wish I Were in Love Again" (Lorenz Hart, Richard Rodgers) – 3:07
2. "Manhattan" (Hart, Rodgers) – 5:18
3. "I Stayed Too Long at the Fair" (Billy Barnes) – 4:42
4. "Ev'rything I've Got" (Hart, Rodgers) – 5:06
5. "How Are Things in Glocca Morra?" (Yip Harburg, Burton Lane) – 5:06
6. "Come Back to Me" (Lane, Alan Jay Lerner) – 4:59
7. "Where Do You Start?" (Alan Bergman, Marilyn Bergman, Johnny Mandel) – 2:58
8. "Taking a Chance on Love" (Vernon Duke, Ted Fetter, John La Touche) – 3:28
9. "I'll See You Again" (Noël Coward) – 3:26
10. "All the Things You Are" (Oscar Hammerstein II, Jerome Kern) – 3:44
11. "Guys and Dolls" (Frank Loesser) – 4:43
12. "My Ship" (Ira Gershwin, Kurt Weill) – 3:12

== Personnel ==
- Rosemary Clooney – vocals
- Warren Vaché Jr. – cornet
- Scott Hamilton – tenor saxophone
- John Oddo – piano
- John Clayton – bass
- Jeff Hamilton – drums
