= Still on the Road =

Studio album by Rosemary Clooney
- Released: 1994
- Recorded: November 22 – 23, 1993
- Genre: Jazz
- Length: 54:06
- Label: Concord
- Producer: John Burk

Rosemary Clooney chronology
Do You Miss New York? (1993)	Still on the Road (1994)	Demi-Centennial (1995)

Professional ratings
Review scores
Source	Rating
AllMusic	4/5 stars

Still on the Road is a 1994 album by Rosemary Clooney. Like her 1992 album Girl Singer, Still on the Road features Clooney singing with a big band directed by her pianist John Oddo.

== Track listing ==
1. "On the Road Again" (Willie Nelson) – 3:35
2. "Rules of the Road" (Cy Coleman, Carolyn Leigh) – 4:25
3. "Corcovado (Quiet Nights of Quiet Stars)" (Antonio Carlos Jobim, Gene Lees) – 3:06
4. "How Are Things in Glocca Morra?" (Yip Harburg, Burton Lane) – 5:00
5. "Let's Get Away from It All" (Tom Adair, Matt Dennis) – 4:07
6. "Moonlight Mississippi (A Whistle Stop Town)" (Willard Robison) – 3:24
7. "(Back Home Again In) Indiana" (James F. Hanley, Ballard MacDonald) – 2:02
8. "Ol' Man River" (Oscar Hammerstein II, Jerome Kern) – 1:56
9. "Take Me Back to Manhattan" (Cole Porter) – 5:09
10. "How Deep Is the Ocean?" (Irving Berlin) – 4:11
11. "Road to Morocco" - with Jack Sheldon (Johnny Burke, Jimmy Van Heusen) – 2:31
12. "Still on the Road" (Earl Brown, Bill Mumy) – 4:34
13. "Till We Meet Again" - with Earl Brown (Raymond B. Egan, Richard A. Whiting) – 3:04
14. "Let's Eat Home" (Dave Frishberg) – 2:59
15. "Still Crazy After All These Years" (Paul Simon) – 4:03

== Personnel ==
=== Performance ===
- Rosemary Clooney – vocals
- Daniel Greco – percussion
- Larry McGuire – trumpet, flugelhorn
- John Oddo – piano
- Joe Porcaro – percussion
- Chuck Berghofer – bass guitar
- Warren Luening – trumpet, flugelhorn
- Tommy Newson – tenor saxophone, flute, clarinet
- Tim May – guitar
- Charles Loper – trombone
- Larry Hall – trumpet, flugelhorn
- Gary Foster – alto saxophone, flute, clarinet
- Jeff Hamilton – drums
- Don Ashworth – baritone saxophone, flute, clarinet, oboe
- Joe Soldo – alto saxophone, flute, clarinet
- Dan Higgins – tenor saxophone, flute, clarinet
- Phil Teele – trombone
- Rick Baptist – trumpet, flugelhorn
