= Jayne Atkinson =

British-American actress (born 1959)

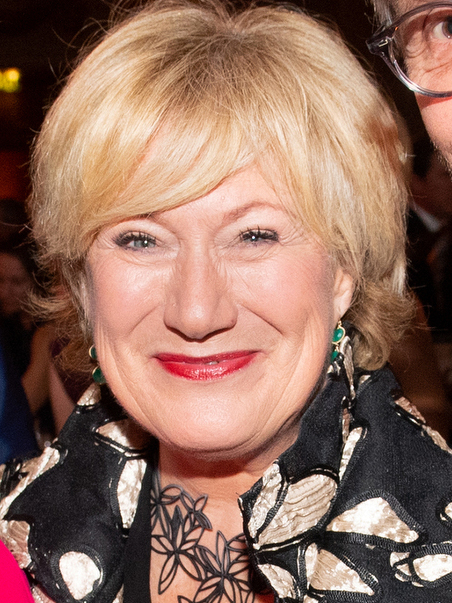
- Atkinson in 2019
- Born: 18 February 1959 (age 67); Bournemouth, England, UK
- Citizenship: United Kingdom; United States
- Education: Northwestern University (BS); Yale University (MFA)
- Occupation: Actress
- Years active: 1985–present
- Spouse(s): Joe Urla Michel Gill (m. 1998)
- Children: 1
- Website: Official Blog

Jayne Atkinson (born 18 February 1959) is a British-American actress. She is best known for the role of Karen Hayes on 24, as well as her Tony Award–nominated roles in The Rainmaker and Enchanted April. She has also appeared in Criminal Minds as BAU Section Chief Erin Strauss, Madam Secretary as United States Vice President Teresa Hurst, and House of Cards as U.S. Secretary of State Catherine Durant. In films, Atkinson notably played foster mother Annie Greenwood in the Free Willy franchise.

== Early life ==
Atkinson was born on 18 February 1959 in Bournemouth, England. Her family moved to the United States in 1968 when she was 9 years old. She grew up in North Miami Beach, Florida, and graduated from Pine Crest School, where she was elected Homecoming Queen in 1977. She the Northwestern University School of Communication (BS Theatre, 1981), where she was initiated as a member of Alpha Chi Omega and a sorority sister of Laura Innes; and graduated with an MFA from the Yale Drama School in 1985.

== Career ==
After working in regional theatres, Atkinson appeared off-Broadway in the Manhattan Theatre Club's production of Bloody Poetry in 1987. She made her Broadway debut the same year in a revival of Arthur Miller's All My Sons.

Subsequently, she landed title roles in more stage productions, which include Henry VIII, Tru, and The Art of Success. She earned a Drama Desk Award for Best Actress in a Play for her performance in The Skriker in 1996. Atkinson's work in the Roundabout Theatre Company's 1999 production of The Rainmaker earned her a Tony Award nomination, and her performance in the 2003 play Enchanted April earned her an Outer Critics Circle Award, another Tony Award nomination and a Drama Desk nomination.

In 2009, she starred as Ruth Condomine in a Broadway revival of Noël Coward's Blithe Spirit, which co-starred Rupert Everett, Christine Ebersole, and Angela Lansbury.

She has appeared in such films as Free Willy, Free Willy 2: The Adventure Home, 12 and Holding, Blank Check, The Village and Syriana. Her television acting credits include A Year in the Life, Parenthood, The X-Files, Law & Order, The Practice, Criminal Minds, 24, Gossip Girl and House of Cards, opposite Kevin Spacey and husband Michel Gill. Her performance in the made-for-TV movie Our Town garnered her a Satellite Award nomination for Best Supporting Actress.

== Personal life ==
Atkinson is a dual citizen of the United Kingdom and the United States. She is married to actor Michel Gill, with whom she has one son. Atkinson and Gill met when they appeared together in a 1989 production of The Heiress at the Long Wharf Theater in New Haven, Connecticut. They both appeared in House of Cards, though not as a couple: Gill played President Garrett Walker and Atkinson played Secretary of State Catherine Durant.

== Filmography ==
=== Film ===
Year	Title	Role	Notes
1992	In the Best Interest of the Children	Wanda Birney	Television movie
1993	Free Willy	Annie Greenwood	
1994	Blank Check	Sandra Waters	
1995	Free Willy 2: The Adventure Home	Annie Greenwood	
2003	Our Town	Mrs. Gibbs	Television movie Nominated—Satellite Award for Best Supporting Actress – Series, Miniseries or Television Film
2004	The Village	Tabitha Walker	
2005	Syriana	Division Chief	
2006	12 and Holding	Ashley Carges	
2008	Recount	Theresa LePore	Television movie
2009	Handsome Harry	Kelly's wife	
2010	The Getaway	Myrtle Sommers	Short film
2012	Revenge for Jolly!	Receptionist	
2016	The Congressman	Casey Winship	
2022	Baby Ruby	Doris	

=== Television ===
Year	Title	Role	Notes
1986–1988	A Year in the Life	Lindley Gardner Eisenberg	25 episodes
1989	Moonlighting	Robin Fuller	Episode: "Shirts and Skins"
1990–1991	Parenthood	Karen Buckman	12 episodes
1995	The X-Files	Willa Ambrose	Episode: "Fearful Symmetry"
1997	The Practice	Ruth Gibson	Episode: "Part 1"
2001–2002	The Education of Max Bickford	Lyla Ortiz	7 episodes
2002	Law & Order	Dr. Claire Snyder	Episode: "Dazzled"
2004	Joan of Arcadia	Fran Montgomery	Episode: "Friday Night"
2006–2007	24	Karen Hayes	30 episodes Nominated—Screen Actors Guild Award for Outstanding Performance by an Ensemble in a Drama Series
2007–2014, 2020	Criminal Minds	Erin Strauss	24 episodes
2008	Law & Order: Special Victims Unit	Marion Springer	Episode: "Savant"
2008	Law & Order	Senator Melanie Carver	Episode: "Political Animal"
2010	Gossip Girl	Dean Reuther	4 episodes
2011	White Collar	Helen Anderson	Episode: "Deadline"
2012	Blue Bloods	Sharon Harris	Episode: "Reagan V. Reagan"
2012	Perception	Helen Paulson	2 episodes
2013	The Following	Jacob's mother	2 episodes
2013–2018	House of Cards	Secretary of State Catherine Durant	35 episodes Nominated—Screen Actors Guild Award for Outstanding Performance by an Ensemble in a Drama Series
2015	Zoo	Amelia Sage	2 episodes
2016	The Good Wife	Nora Valentine	Episode: "Landing"
2016	Chicago Med	Laura Clay	Episode: "Disorder"
2018	Madam Secretary	Vice President Teresa Hurst	5 episodes; Seasons 4–5
2018	The Walking Dead	Georgie	Episode: "The Key"
2018	Castle Rock	Daria Reese	2 episodes
2019	Bluff City Law	Della Bedford	Series Regular
2021	Clarice	Ruth Martin	4 episodes
2024	Death and Other Details	Katherine Collier	Recurring

=== Stage ===
Year	Title	Role	Notes
1987	All My Sons	Sue Bayliss	
1989–1990	Tru	Jan	
1997–1998	Ivanov	Anna Petrovna	
1999–2000	The Rainmaker	Lizzie Curry	Nominated—Tony Award for Best Actress in a Play
2002–2003	Our Town	Mrs. Gibbs	
2003	Enchanted April	Lotty Wilton	Nominated—Drama Desk Award for Outstanding Actress in a Play; Nominated—Tony Award for Best Actress in a Play
2009	Blithe Spirit	Ruth	
2019	Ann	Ann Richards	Arena Stage, Washington D.C.
