= Rosemary Clooney Sings Rodgers, Hart & Hammerstein =

Studio album by Rosemary Clooney
- Released: 1990
- Recorded: October 1989
- Studio: Sage & Sound Recording, Hollywood, California
- Genre: Jazz
- Length: 49:12
- Label: Concord
- Producer: John Burk

Rosemary Clooney chronology
Show Tunes (1989)	Rosemary Clooney Sings Rodgers, Hart & Hammerstein (1990)	For the Duration (1991)

Professional ratings
Review scores
Source	Rating
AllMusic	2.5/5 stars

Rosemary Clooney Sings Rodgers, Hart & Hammerstein is a 1990 album by Rosemary Clooney, consisting of songs composed by Richard Rodgers, with lyrics by Lorenz Hart, and Oscar Hammerstein II.

== Track listing ==
1. "Oh, What a Beautiful Mornin'" – 2:15
2. "People Will Say We're in Love" – 4:55
3. "Love, Look Away" – 3:46
4. "The Gentleman Is a Dope" – 6:07
5. "It Might as Well Be Spring" – 2:54
6. "The Sweetest Sounds" – 6:22
7. "I Could Write a Book" – 3:10
8. "You Took Advantage of Me" – 3:59
9. "The Lady Is a Tramp" – 5:58
10. "Little Girl Blue" – 4:34
11. "My Romance" – 4:01
12. "Yours Sincerely" – 3:15

All music composed by Richard Rodgers. Tracks one to five, lyrics by Oscar Hammerstein II, "The Sweetest Sounds", lyrics by Rodgers, tracks seven to twelve, lyrics by Lorenz Hart.

== Personnel ==
- Rosemary Clooney – vocals
- Jack Sheldon – trumpet, vocal (track 2)
- Chauncey Welsch – trombone
- Warren Vaché Jr. – cornet
- Scott Hamilton – tenor saxophone
- John Oddo – piano, vocal and instrumental arrangements
- John Clayton – bass
- Joe LaBarbera – drums
- The L.A. Jazz Choir – vocals (tracks 1,3,7,10-12)
