= Rosemary Clooney Sings the Lyrics of Johnny Mercer =

Studio album by Rosemary Clooney
- Released: August 1987
- Recorded: 1987
- Genre: Vocal jazz
- Length: 49:12
- Label: Concord
- Producer: John Burk

Rosemary Clooney chronology
Rosemary Clooney Sings the Music of Jimmy Van Heusen (1986)	Rosemary Clooney Sings the Lyrics of Johnny Mercer (1987)	Show Tunes (1989)

Professional ratings
Review scores
Source	Rating
Allmusic	3/5 stars

Rosemary Clooney Sings the Lyrics of Johnny Mercer is a 1987 album by Rosemary Clooney, of songs with lyrics by Johnny Mercer. Most of the album features Clooney singing with a small swing group directed by pianist John Oddo, though Clooney performs two of the selections ("I Remember You" and "P.S. I Love You") as duets with guitarist Ed Bickert.

== Track listing ==
All lyrics by Johnny Mercer, composers indicated.
No.	Title	Music	Length
1.	"Something's Gotta Give"	Johnny Mercer	3:21
2.	"Laura"	David Raksin	4:47
3.	"Any Place I Hang My Hat Is Home"	Harold Arlen	5:25
4.	"Talk to Me Baby"	Robert Emmett Dolan	4:21
5.	"I Remember You"	Victor Schertzinger	3:12
6.	"When October Goes"	Barry Manilow	4:44
7.	"Dream Medley: Dream/Hit the Road to Dreamland"	Johnny Mercer, Harold Arlen	5:53
8.	"G.I. Jive"	Johnny Mercer	5:32
9.	"Skylark"	Hoagy Carmichael	3:18
10.	"Hooray for Hollywood"	Richard A. Whiting	3:01
11.	"P.S. I Love You"	Gordon Jenkins	2:59
12.	"Goody Goody"	Matty Malneck	3:24

== Personnel ==
- Rosemary Clooney – vocals
- Dan Barrett
- Scott Hamilton – tenor saxophone
- John Oddo – piano
- Ed Bickert – guitar
- Michael Moore – bass
- Joe Cocuzzo – drums
