= Rock Requiem =

Studio album by Lalo Schifrin
- Released: 1971
- Recorded: May 17, 18 & 19, 1971; Hollywood, California
- Genre: Rock
- Length: 35:32
- Label: Verve; V6-8801
- Producer: Lalo Schifrin

Lalo Schifrin chronology
Kelly's Heroes (1970)	Rock Requiem (1971)	Enter the Dragon (1973)

Rock Requiem (subtitled For the Dead in the Southeast Asia War) is an album by Argentine composer, pianist and conductor Lalo Schifrin recorded in 1971 and released on the Verve label.

== Track listing ==
All compositions by Lalo Schifrin

1. "The Procession" - 4:18
2. "Introit" - 2:57
3. "Kyrie Eleison" - 4:47
4. "Gradual" - 3:23
5. "Tract" - 2:40
6. "Offertory Verse" - 3:27
7. "Sanctus Benedictus" - 3:40
8. "Agnus Dei" - 4:20
9. "Final Prayer" - 6:00
- Recorded in Hollywood, California on May 17 (tracks 2 & 7), May 18 (tracks 1, 5 & 8) and May 19 (tracks 3, 4, 6 & 9), 1971

== Personnel ==
- Lalo Schifrin - arranger, conductor
- Bud Brisbois, Buddy Childers, Ray Triscari - trumpet
- Milt Bernhart, Lew McCreary, Richard Noel, James Henderson, Ken Shroyer - trombone
- David Duke, Bill Hinshaw, George Price, Henry Sigismonti - French horn
- Roger Bobo, John Johnson - tuba
- Tom Scott - flute, saxophone
- John Ellis, William Criss - oboe
- Donald Christlieb, Jack Marsh - bassoon
- Larry Muhoberac - piano
- Larry Knechtel, Mike Melvoin - organ
- Dennis Budimer, Howard Roberts, Louis Shelton - guitar
- Max Bennett - bass
- Ronald Tutt - drums
- Larry Bunker - tympani
- King Errison - congas
- Sandra Crouch - tambourine
- Joe Porcaro, Emil Richards - percussion
- Benjamin Barrett - orchestra manager
- Alexander Saint Charles - voice
- The Mike Curb Congregation - chorus
