= Tempo Alcoa =

The Tempo Alcoa was a jet-powered hydroplane designed and built by Les Staudacher, using Aluminum Company of America (ALCOA) aluminum. Hydroplane driver and band leader Guy Lombardo for the sake of setting a new world speed record on water.

In 1959, Lombardo was attempting a run on the absolute water speed record with the jet engine-powered Tempo Alcoa when it was destroyed on a radio-controlled test run doing over 250 miles per hour (400 km/h).

A new record was never achieved by the Tempo Alcoa.
