= Enter the Dragon (soundtrack) =

Soundtrack album by Lalo Schifrin
- Released: 1973
- Recorded: June 1973; Burbank, California
- Genre: Film score
- Length: 25:46
- Labels: Warner Bros. BS-2727
- Producer: Nick Redman

Lalo Schifrin chronology
Rock Requiem (1971)	Enter the Dragon (1973)	Black Widow (1976)

Enter the Dragon is a soundtrack album to the motion picture of the same name by Argentine composer, pianist and conductor Lalo Schifrin recorded in 1973 and released on the Warner Bros. label.

== Reception ==
The Allmusic review states "The opening "Theme from Enter the Dragon" is unquestionably a product of its time. While the tune is occasionally infused with Eastern-sounding chords and instrumental voicings, the adrenaline-pumping proto-funk backbeat is drenched in wah-wah guitar, dramatic brass interjections and (presumably) Lee's intimidating Kiai (battle cry) vocalizations. With the notable exception of the reprise of the "Theme From...," the remaining eight selections primarily consist of mood-enhancing sounds to accompany rather than react to—the action taking place on screen".

Professional ratings
Review scores
Source	Rating
Allmusic	0/5 stars

== Track listing ==
All tracks are written by Lalo Schifrin.

No.	Title	Length
1.	"Theme from Enter the Dragon"	2:23
2.	"Sampans"	1:57
3.	"The Monk"	3:25
4.	"The Gentle Softness"	2:42
5.	"The Big Battle"	3:36
6.	"Han's Island"	2:57
7.	"The Human Fly"	3:14
8.	"Bamboo Bird Cage"	2:42
9.	"Broken Mirrors"	2:40
10.	"Theme from Enter the Dragon (reprise)"	1:07
Total length:		25:46

== Personnel ==
- Lalo Schifrin - arranger, conductor
- John Audino, Tony Terran, Eugene E. Young - trumpet
- Dick Noel, Hoyt Bohannon, Dick Nash, George Roberts - trombone
- Vincent DeRosa, James Decker, Richard Perissi - French horn
- Ronnie Lang, Sheridon Stokes, Jerome Richardson, John Ellis, Jack Marsh - reeds
- Clare Fischer, Ralph Grierson, Joe Sample - keyboards
- Al Vescovo, Bernie Lewis, Larry Carlton, Tommy Tedesco, Dennis Budimir, Peter Woodford, Bob Bain - guitar
- Max Bennett - bass
- Stix Hooper - drums, percussion
- Larry Bunker, Emil Richards, Joe Porcaro, Ken Watson, Robert Zimmitti, Francisco Aguabella - percussion
- Israel Baker, Howard Griffin, Anatol Kaminsky, Joseph Livoti, Joseph Livoti, Jerome Reisler, George Kast, Herman Clebanoff, Gerald Vinci, Alex Beller, Bonnie Douglas, Paul Shure, Alfred Lustgarten, Erno Neufeld - violin
- Sam Ross, Myra Kestenbaum, Virginia Majewski, Allan Harshman, Rollice Dale - viola
- Raphael Kramer, Kurt Reher, Eleanor Slatkin, Frederick Seyhora - cello
- Dorothy Remsen - harp
- Kurt Wolff - contractor
- Dick Hazard - arranger
