= Rosemary Clooney Sings the Music of Jimmy Van Heusen =

Studio album by Rosemary Clooney
- Released: 1986
- Recorded: 1986
- Genre: Vocal jazz
- Length: 40:14
- Label: Concord
- Producer: John Burk

Rosemary Clooney chronology
Rosemary Clooney Sings Ballads (1985)	Rosemary Clooney Sings the Music of Jimmy Van Heusen (1986)	Rosemary Clooney Sings the Lyrics of Johnny Mercer (1987)

Professional ratings
Review scores
Source	Rating
Allmusic	3/5 stars

Rosemary Clooney Sings the Music of Jimmy Van Heusen is a 1986 album by Rosemary Clooney, of songs composed by Jimmy Van Heusen. Sammy Cahn, who provided lyrics for 5 of the 10 selections on the album, contributed liner notes for the album. Clooney performs two of the selections ("The Second Time Around" and "Call Me Irresponsible") as duets with guitarist Ed Bickert.

== Track listing ==
1. "Love Won't Let You Get Away" (Sammy Cahn) – 4:00
2. "I Thought About You" (Johnny Mercer) – 5:11
3. "My Heart Is a Hobo" (Johnny Burke) – 3:10
4. "The Second Time Around" (Cahn) – 3:13
5. "It Could Happen to You" (Burke) – 4:30
6. "Imagination" (Burke) – 4:05
7. "Like Someone in Love" (Burke) – 4:50
8. "Call Me Irresponsible" (Cahn) – 3:30
9. "Walking Happy" (Cahn) – 3:06
10. "The Last Dance" (Cahn) – 4:39

All music by Jimmy Van Heusen, lyricists indicated.

== Personnel ==
- Rosemary Clooney – vocals
- Warren Vaché Jr. – cornet
- Scott Hamilton – tenor saxophone
- John Oddo – piano
- Ed Bickert – guitar (tracks 1,2,4,5,8)
- Emily Remler – guitar (tracks 3,7,9,10)
- Michael Moore – bass
- Joe Cocuzzo – drums
