= Brazil (Rosemary Clooney album) =

Studio album by Rosemary Clooney
- Released: June 6, 2000
- Recorded: 1999, 2000
- Genres: Vocal jazz, Bossa nova
- Length: 54:06
- Label: Concord
- Producer: John Burk

Rosemary Clooney chronology
At Long Last (1998)	Brazil (2000)	Sentimental Journey: The Girl Singer and Her New Big Band (2001)

Professional ratings
Review scores
Source	Rating
Allmusic	3/5 stars

Brazil is a 2000 album by Rosemary Clooney. John Pizzarelli accompanies Clooney on vocals on five of the tracks, and sings Antonio Carlos Jobim's "Wave". Diana Krall duets with Clooney on "The Boy from Ipanema". The arrangements primarily feature woodwinds (including several flutes, and saxophone soloist Gary Foster and Nino Tempo), piano and guitar, and do not feature brass instruments.

== Track listing ==
1. "Brazil" (Ary Barroso, Bob Russell) – 6:52
2. "Corcovado (Quiet Nights of Quiet Stars)" (Vinícius de Moraes, Gene Lees, Antônio Carlos Jobim) – 4:26
3. "The Boy from Ipanema" (de Moraes, Norman Gimbel, Jobim) – 4:04
4. "Wave" (Jobim) – 3:36
5. "Once I Loved" (de Moraes, Ray Gilbert, Jobim) – 3:56
6. "Desafinado" (de Moraes, Jon Hendricks) – 4:36
7. "I Concentrate on You" (Cole Porter) – 2:34
8. "One Note Samba" (Jon Hendricks, Jobim, Newton Mendonça) – 3:05
9. "How Insensitive" (de Moraes, Gimbel, Jobim) – 2:38
10. "Let Go" (Baden Powell de Aquino) – 3:07
11. "Dindi" (Aloysio de Oliveria, Gilbert, Jobim) – 4:14
12. "Waters of March (Aguas de Março)" (Jobim) – 3:14
13. "Meditation" (Gimbel, Jobim, Mendonça) – 4:40
14. "Sweet Happy Life" (Luiz Bonfá, Gimbel, Antonio Maria de Moraes, Andre Michel Salvet) – 4:58
15. "A Day in the Life of a Fool" (Bonfá, Carl Sigman) – 3:19
16. "Brazil (Reprise)" – 1:46

== Personnel ==
- Rosemary Clooney – vocals
- Diana Krall – piano, vocals
- Jeff Hamilton – drums
- Chauncey Welsch – trombone
- Oscar Castro-Neves – guitar
- Walfredo De Los Reyes Jr. – percussion
- George Graham – trumpet
- John Oddo – piano
- John Pizzarelli – guitar
- Chuck Berghofer – bass guitar
- Paulinho da Costa – percussion
- John Ferraro – drums
- Nino Tempo – tenor saxophone
- Gary Foster – alto saxophone
- Bob Summers – trumpet
