= Sentimental Journey: The Girl Singer and Her New Big Band =

Studio album by Rosemary Clooney
- Released: August 14, 2001
- Recorded: 2001
- Genre: Vocal jazz
- Length: 52:30
- Label: Concord

Rosemary Clooney chronology
Brazil (1999)	Sentimental Journey: The Girl Singer and Her New Big Band (2001)	The Last Concert (2002)

Professional ratings
Review scores
Source	Rating
Allmusic	4/5 stars

Sentimental Journey: The Girl Singer and Her New Big Band is a 2001 album by Rosemary Clooney. This was Clooney's last studio recording. Clooney sings on the album with Big Kahuna and the Copa Cat Pack, a 12-piece swing band led by musician Matt Catingub. Clooney's longtime musical director John Oddo arranged and conducted the music. Clooney and Big Kahuna and the Copa Cat Pack recorded the album following a lengthy performance run at New York's Regency Hotel.

== Track listing ==
1. "That Old Black Magic" (Harold Arlen, Johnny Mercer) – 3:33
2. "I'm Glad There Is You" (Jimmy Dorsey, Paul Mertz) – 3:59
3. "I've Got My Love to Keep Me Warm" (Irving Berlin) – 3:35
4. "You Go to My Head" (J. Fred Coots, Haven Gillespie) – 5:07
5. "And the Angels Sing" (Ziggy Elman, Mercer) – 3:08
6. "Happiness is a Thing Called Joe" (Harold Arlen, E.Y. "Yip" Harburg) – 4:47
7. "I'm the Big Band Singer" (Merv Griffin) – 2:29
8. "You Belong to Me" (Pee Wee King, Redd Stewart, Chilton Price) – 3:49
9. "I'll Be Around" (Alec Wilder) – 2:50
10. "I Gotta Right to Sing the Blues" (Arlen, Ted Koehler) – 3:51
11. "Ya Got Class" (Ray Evans, Jay Livingston) – 2:46
12. "Rockin' Chair" (Hoagy Carmichael) – 4:20
13. "The Singer" (Joe Cocuzzo, Vincent Falcone, Jr.) – 2:06
14. "They Can't Take That Away from Me" (George Gershwin, Ira Gershwin) – 3:55
15. "Sentimental Journey" (Les Brown, Ben Homer, Bud Green) – 4:06
16. Medley: "I Cried for You"/"Who's Sorry Now?"/"Goody Goody" (Gus Arnheim, Arthur Freed, Abe Lyman)/(Ted Snyder, Bert Kalmar, Harry Ruby)/(Mercer, Matty Malneck) – 3:57

== Personnel ==
- Rosemary Clooney – vocals
