= Paradise Island (musical) =

- Program Cover
- Music: Carmen Lombardo and John Jacob Loeb
- Lyrics: Carmen Lombardo and John Jacob Loeb
- Book: Carmen Lombardo and John Jacob Loeb

The Legend of Paradise Island is a Hawaiian Musical Fantasy in two acts, with book, music, and lyrics by Carmen Lombardo and John Jacob Loeb. The book was adapted by Francis Swann. The show was produced by Guy Lombardo at the Jones Beach Marine Theater. The show opened on June 22, 1961.

The book was directed by Francis Swann, and choreographed and staged by June Taylor, scenery designed by George Jenkins. Costumes by Winiford Morton. Lighting by Peggy Clark. The musical direction and vocal arrangements were by Pembroke Davenport. The orchestrations were by Joe Glover and the dance arrangements were by Milt Sherman. The entire production was under the supervision of Arnold Spector. It ran for 75 performances.

The cast starred Elaine Malbin, Arthur Treacher, and William Gaxton and included Jack Washburn, Norman Atkins, Honey Sanders, Ralph Purdum, Harold Gary, Robert Penn, The Toy Boys, Tom Noel, Little Joe, Elsa Raven, and The John Piilani Watkins Group, Kathy Gore, according to the program.

According to Louis Calta's review in the New York Times, the story revolves around an American industrialist (William Gaxton), his son (Jack Washburn), and his butler (Arthur Treacher), who find themselves shipwrecked on a tiny Hawaiian island. Mr. Lombardo brought 32 performers from Hawaii, ages 6 to 21, for the outdoor venture, dancing the hula, sword dances, fire dances, torchlight processions, and a luau.

The show was revived by Guy Lombardo the next season, starting June 27, 1962, for 68 performances. ,

== Songs ==
Act 1

- “Happy Hukilau”
- “Once Upon A Time”
- “The Coconut Wireless”
- “My World and Your World”
- “The Menehune”
- “Hokunani”
- “Luau Chant”
- “What Could Be More Romantic”

Act 2

- “It’s a Great Day for Hawaii”
- “I’ll Just Pretend”*
- “Never Any Time To Play”
- “Beyond the Clouds”
- “Ceremonial Chant”
- “Ceremonial March”
- “Now the Time Has Come”
- “Paradise Island”
