= Do You Miss New York? =

Studio album by Rosemary Clooney
- Released: 1993
- Recorded: September 14 – 17, 1992
- Length: 51:10
- Label: Concord
- Producer: John Burk

Rosemary Clooney chronology
Girl Singer (1992)	Do You Miss New York? (1993)	Still on the Road (1994)

Professional ratings
Review scores
Source	Rating
AllMusic	4/5 stars

Do You Miss New York? is a 1993 album by Rosemary Clooney.

Clooney appeared at the Rainbow Room in New York City in February 1993 to celebrate the album's release.

Reviewer Chip Deffaa wrote in Entertainment Weekly, "What is it that makes Rosemary Clooney, in her 60s, so increasingly compelling? Her still-clear voice, now colored by regret, has an honesty and impact it never had in her youth. With jazzmen providing her dream support, 'Do You Miss New York?' is as poignant an album as she has yet recorded."

== Track listing ==
1. "Do You Miss New York?" (Dave Frishberg) – 5:14
2. "Gee Baby, Ain't I Good to You" (Andy Razaf, Don Redman) – 3:34
3. "As Long as I Live" (Harold Arlen, Ted Koehler) – 3:24
4. "May I Come In?" (Marvin Fisher, Jack Segal) – 6:39
5. "Route 66" (Bobby Troup) – 7:50
6. "A Beautiful Friendship" (Donald Kahn, Stanley Styne) – 2:10
7. "It's Only a Paper Moon" (Arlen, Yip Harburg, Billy Rose) – 3:27
8. "I Ain't Got Nothin' But the Blues" (Duke Ellington, Don George) – 5:57
9. "I Wish You Love" (Léo Chauliac, Albert Beach, Charles Trenet) – 3:05
10. "I Get Along Without You Very Well" (Hoagy Carmichael, Jane Brown Thompson) – 4:12
11. "We'll Be Together Again" (Carl T. Fischer, Frankie Laine) – 6:08

== Personnel ==
- Rosemary Clooney – vocals
- Warren Vaché Jr. – cornet
- Scott Hamilton – tenor saxophone
- John Oddo – piano
- Bucky Pizzarelli – guitar
- John Pizzarelli – vocals and guitar solo on "It's Only a Paper Moon"
- David Finck – bass guitar
- Joe Cocuzzo – drums
