= For the Duration =

Studio album by Rosemary Clooney
- Released: 1991
- Recorded: October 15 – 17, 1990
- Length: 56:24
- Label: Concord
- Producer: John Burk

Rosemary Clooney chronology
Rosemary Clooney Sings Rodgers, Hart & Hammerstein (1991)	For the Duration (1991)	Girl Singer (1992)

Professional ratings
Review scores
Source	Rating
Allmusic	2.5/5 stars

For the Duration is a 1991 album by Rosemary Clooney, of songs popular during World War II. Clooney is accompanied by her usual small jazz group featuring Warren Vaché Jr., Scott Hamilton, and John Oddo, plus a string section.

== Track listing ==
1. "No Love, No Nothin'" (Leo Robin, Harry Warren) – 4:00
2. "Don't Fence Me In" (Robert Fletcher, Cole Porter) – 4:25
3. "I Don't Want to Walk Without You Baby" (Frank Loesser, Jule Styne) – 3:59
4. "Ev'ry Time We Say Goodbye" (Porter) – 4:08
5. "You'd Be So Nice to Come Home To" (Porter) – 3:23
6. "Sentimental Journey" (Les Brown, Bud Green, Ben Homer) – 4:28
7. "For All We Know" (J. Fred Coots, Sam M. Lewis) – 4:06
8. "September Song" (Maxwell Anderson, Kurt Weill) – 4:19
9. "These Foolish Things (Remind Me of You)" (Harry Link, Holt Marvell, Jack Strachey) – 5:58
10. "They're Either Too Young or Too Old" (Loesser, Arthur Schwartz) – 2:14
11. "The More I See You" (Mack Gordon, Warren) – 4:40
12. "(There'll Be Bluebirds Over) The White Cliffs of Dover" (Walter Kent, Nat Burton) – 2:29
13. "Saturday Night (Is the Loneliest Night of the Week)" (Sammy Cahn, Styne) – 3:48
14. "I'll Be Seeing You" (Sammy Fain, Irving Kahal) – 4:18

== Personnel ==
- Rosemary Clooney – vocals
- John Oddo – piano
- Chuck Berghofer, Jim Hughart – bass guitar
- Jake Hanna – drums
- Scott Hamilton – tenor saxophone
- Warren Vaché Jr. – cornet
