= Our Town (2003 film) =

2003 television film

- Based on: Our Town (1938 play) by Thornton Wilder
- Written by: Thornton Wilder
- Directed by: James Naughton
- Starring: Paul Newman; Maggie Lacey; Ben Fox; Jayne Atkinson; Frank Converse; Jane Curtin; Jeffrey DeMunn
- Music by: John Oddo
- Country of origin: United States
- Original language: English

Production
- Executive producer: Joanne Woodward
- Producers: Marc Bauman; Rebecca Eaton
- Cinematography: Phil Abraham
- Editor: Camilla Toniolo
- Running time: 120 minutes
- Production companies: Line by Line Productions; Westport Country Playhouse

Original release
- Network: Showtime
- Release: May 24, 2003

Our Town is a 2003 American made-for-television film adaptation of the 1938 play of the same name by Thornton Wilder starring Paul Newman, who was nominated for both an Emmy Award and a Screen Actors Guild Award for outstanding acting. It was filmed at the Booth Theatre in Manhattan, where it played on Broadway in 2002. The production originated at the Westport Country Playhouse. The film originally aired May 24, 2003, on Showtime and was also shown on PBS as part of Masterpiece Theatre on October 5, 2003.

== Plot summary ==
Our Town describes the relationship between George Gibbs and Emily Webb, in the small town of Grover's Corners, New Hampshire.

== Cast ==
- Jayne Atkinson as Mrs. Gibbs
- Wendy Barrie-Wilson as Woman in Balcony
- Reathel Bean as Man in Auditorium
- John Braden as Professor Willard
- Tom Brennan as Joe Stoddard
- Kieran Campion as Baseball Player
- Patch Darragh as Baseball Player
- Frank Converse as Dr. Gibbs
- Jane Curtin as Mrs. Webb
- Jeffrey DeMunn as Mr. Webb
- Mia Dillon as Mrs. Soames
- Conor Donovan as Wally Webb
- Ben Fox as George Gibbs
- Kristen Hahn as Rebecca Gibbs
- Carter Jackson as Sam Craig
- Maggie Lacey as Emily Webb
- Stephen Mendillo as Constable Warren
- Paul Newman as Stage Manager
- Stephen Spinella as Simon Stimson
- T.J. Sullivan as Joe Crowell
- Jake Robards as Howie Newsome
- Cynthia Wallace as Woman in Auditorium
- Travis Walters as Si Crowell

== Awards ==
- Emmy Nomination (2003): Outstanding Lead Actor in a Miniseries or a Movie (Paul Newman)
- Golden Satellite Award Nominations (2004):
  - Best Motion Picture Made for Television
  - Best Performance by an Actress in a Supporting Role in a Miniseries or a Motion Picture Made for Television (Jayne Atkinson)
  - Best Performance by an Actress in a Supporting Role in a Miniseries or a Motion Picture Made for Television (Jane Curtin)
- Screen Actors Guild Award Nomination (2004): Outstanding Performance by a Male Actor in a Television Movie or Miniseries (Paul Newman)
