= Seems like Old Times (song) =

Song performed by Guy Lombardo

"Seems Like Old Times"

Single by Guy Lombardo and His Royal Canadians
- A-side: "Symphony"
- Released: December 1945
- Recorded: November 15, 1945
- Genre: Traditional pop
- Length: 2:57
- Label: Decca
- Songwriters: Carmen Lombardo, John Jacob Loeb

"Seems like Old Times" is a popular song written by Carmen Lombardo and John Jacob Loeb. The tune was derived from a 1939 song, "It Seems like Old Times" with music and lyrics by Sam H. Stept and Charles Tobias, recorded by Freddy Martin, Ruby Newman and others.

It was originally recorded by Guy Lombardo's orchestra (vocal by Don Rodney) on November 15, 1945 and released by Decca Records as catalog number 18737. Hit versions in 1946 were by Lombardo (No. 7 in the charts), Vaughn Monroe (also No. 7) and Kate Smith (No. 12).

The recording by Joe Loss and His Orchestra with vocal by Sam Browne was made in London on April 17, 1946. It was released by EMI on the His Master's Voice label as catalog number BD 5931.

Many other artists have recorded the song including Ella Fitzgerald for her 1968 Columbia album 30 by Ella, Rosemary Clooney for her album At Long Last (1998), and Laufey for her album A Matter of Time.

== In popular culture ==
- It was used as the theme song of Arthur Godfrey on his radio programs and also played a central role in Woody Allen's 1977 film Annie Hall. Its inclusion in the latter helped "Seems like Old Times" finish at No. 90 in AFI's 100 Years...100 Songs survey of top tunes in American cinema in 2004.
