= Dedicated to Nelson =

Studio album by Rosemary Clooney
- Released: 1996
- Recorded: September 27 – 30, 1995
- Genre: Middle of the road
- Label: Concord
- Producer: John Burk

Rosemary Clooney chronology
Demi-Centennial (1995)	Dedicated to Nelson (1996)	White Christmas (1996)

Professional ratings
Review scores
Source	Rating
AllMusic	4/5 stars

Dedicated to Nelson is a 1996 album by singer Rosemary Clooney, dedicated to the arranger Nelson Riddle. Clooney's television show from 1956-57 featured arrangements by Riddle, and a selection of those original Riddle arrangements are presented here, performed by a big band. Arrangers Eddie Karam and David Berger assisted with expanding arrangements that had been shorter in their original television show incarnations and with transcribing the arrangements (the sheet music of which had not been preserved) from the recorded television audio.

Riddle also arranged two studio albums by Clooney, Rosie Solves the Swingin' Riddle! from 1960, and 1963's Love. Clooney and Riddle had an affair lasting several years, which contributed to the breakup of their respective marriages.

== Track listing ==
1. "A Foggy Day" (George Gershwin, Ira Gershwin) – 3:18
2. "The Gold Diggers' Song (We're in the Money)" (Al Dubin, Harry Warren) – 2:49
3. "It's So Peaceful in the Country" (Alec Wilder) – 4:09
4. "Limehouse Blues" (Philip Braham, Douglas Furber) – 2:31
5. "Do You Know What It Means to Miss New Orleans?" (Louis Alter, Eddie DeLange) – 3:51
6. "I Got It Bad (and That Ain't Good)" (Duke Ellington, Paul Francis Webster) – 3:18
7. "The Continental" (Con Conrad, Herb Magidson) – 3:12
8. "Mean to Me" (Fred E. Ahlert, Roy Turk) – 3:42
9. "You're in Kentucky" (Larry Shay, Haven Gillespie, George Little) – 2:55
10. "As Time Goes By" (Herman Hupfeld) – 4:10
11. "Haven't Got a Worry" (Ray Evans, Jay Livingston) – 2:39
12. "Mangos" (Sid Wayne) – 2:46
13. "At Sundown" (Walter Donaldson) – 2:27
14. "A Woman Likes to Be Told" (Harold Adamson, Hoagy Carmichael) – 3:54
15. "What Is This Thing Called Love?" (Cole Porter) – 2:51
16. "Come Rain or Come Shine" (Harold Arlen, Johnny Mercer) – 3:04

== Personnel ==
=== Performance ===
- Rosemary Clooney – vocals
- John Oddo – arranger, conductor
