= The Last Concert (Rosemary Clooney album) =

Live album by Rosemary Clooney
- Released: November 19, 2002
- Recorded: November 16, 2001
- Label: Concord Jazz
- Producer: Matt Catingub

Rosemary Clooney chronology
Sentimental Journey: The Girl Singer and Her New Big Band (2001)	The Last Concert (2002)

The Last Concert is a live album by Rosemary Clooney, released through Concord Jazz in November 2002. On the album, Clooney is accompanied by Big Kahuna and the Copa Cat Pack, a 12-piece swing band led by musician Matt Catingub, and the Honolulu Symphony Pops Orchestra, of which Catingub was the Conductor. Clooney worked with the band on her final studio recording, Sentimental Journey: The Girl Singer and Her New Big Band.

This was Clooney's first live album, and it was the last in her fifty-five year career as a recording artist.

== Reception ==
Professional ratings
Review scores
Source	Rating
Allmusic	3/5 stars

The Allmusic review by William Ruhlmann awarded the album three stars and remarking on Clooney's final performance said that "Not surprisingly...there isn't anything about it to suggest finality specifically. But, as an appearance by a veteran performer with a long career to draw upon, it necessarily had a retrospective feel and, occurring only two months after the September 11, 2001, terrorist attacks, it concluded with a reverent tone, Clooney's first recording of 'God Bless America'."

== Track listing ==
1. Overture: Medley – 4:35
  1. "Tenderly" (Jack Lawrence & Walter Gross)
  2. "White Christmas" (Irving Berlin)
  3. "Half As Much" (Curley Williams)
  4. "Sisters" (Berlin)
  5. "This Ole House" (Stuart Hamblen)
2. "Sentimental Journey" (Les Brown, Arthur Green, Ben Homer) – 4:14
3. Dialogue – 1:22
4. "I'm Confessin' (That I Love You)" (Don Dougherty, Al Neiburg, Ellis Reynolds) – 3:45
5. "Just in Time" (Betty Comden, Adolph Green, Jule Styne) – 2:58
6. Dialogue – 0:48
7. "Happiness Is a Thing Called Joe" (Harold Arlen, Yip Harburg) – 4:32
8. "You Go to My Head" (John Frederick Coots, Haven Gillespie) – 4:55
9. "Rockin' Chair" (Hoagy Carmichael) – 4:08
10. Dialogue – 0:55
11. "Ol' Man River" (Oscar Hammerstein II, Jerome Kern) – 2:07
12. "The Singer" (Joe Cocuzzo, Vincent Falcone) – 2:29
13. "They Can't Take That Away from Me" (George Gershwin, Ira Gershwin) – 3:46
14. "God Bless America" (Berlin) – 4:11
