= Demi-Centennial =

Studio album by Rosemary Clooney
- Released: 1995
- Recorded: October 10 – November 11, 1994
- Genre: Jazz
- Length: 54:06
- Label: Concord
- Producer: John Burk

Rosemary Clooney chronology
Still on the Road (1994)	Demi-Centennial (1995)	Dedicated to Nelson (1996)

Professional ratings
Review scores
Source	Rating
AllMusic	3/5 stars

Demi-Centennial is a 1995 studio album by American jazz singer Rosemary Clooney. Clooney sings with a big band backing on some of the tracks, while on others she uses a string orchestra.

== Track listing ==
1. "Danny Boy" (Frederic Weatherly) – 3:07
2. "The Coffee Song" (Bob Hilliard, Dick Miles) – 2:47
3. "(I'm) Confessin' (That I Love You)" (Doc Daugherty, Al J. Neiburg, Ellis Reynolds) – 4:31
4. "I Left My Heart in San Francisco" (George Cory, Douglass Cross) – 3:50
5. "Old Friends" (Stephen Sondheim) – 4:59
6. "White Christmas" (Irving Berlin) – 3:16
7. "There Will Never Be Another You" (Mack Gordon, Harry Warren) – 3:24
8. "Falling in Love Again (Can't Help It)" (Frederick Hollander, Sammy Lerner) – 2:35
9. "Sophisticated Lady" (Duke Ellington, Irving Mills, Mitchell Parish) – 3:40
10. "How Will I Remember You" (Walter Gross, Carl Sigman) – 4:16
11. "Mambo Italiano" (Bob Merrill) – 2:35
12. "The Promise (I'll Never Say Goodbye)" (Alan Bergman, Marilyn Bergman) – 4:09
13. "Heart's Desire" (Alan Broadbent, Dave Frishberg) - 4:06
14. "We'll Meet Again" (Ross Parker, Hughie Charles) – 4:15
15. "Time Flies" (Jimmy Webb) – 3:36
16. "Dear Departed Past" (Dave Frishberg) – 6:25

== Personnel ==
- Rosemary Clooney – vocals
- John Oddo – arranger, conductor
