= A Wonderful Year =

A Wonderful Year!

Studio album by Guy Lombardo
- Released: 1966
- Label: Capitol
- Producer: Lee Gillette

Guy Lombardo chronology
Dance Medley Time (1966)	A Wonderful Year! (1966)	Guy Lombardo's Broadway (1966)

A Wonderful Year! Guy Lombardo—and His Royal Canadians is a long-playing record album (LP) issued by Capitol Records in the United States in 1966.

== Track listing ==
Side 1

1. King of the Road
2. Dear Heart
3. Alley Cat
4. Deep Purple
5. May the Bird of Paradise Fly Up Your Nose
6. A Taste Of Honey

Side 2

1. Spanish Eyes
2. My Kind of Town
3. Red Roses for a Blue Lady
4. The Shadow of Your Smile
5. Thunderball
