= Guy Lombardo =

Canadian bandleader and violinist (1902–1977)

Coordinates: 42.963674°N 81.293225°W

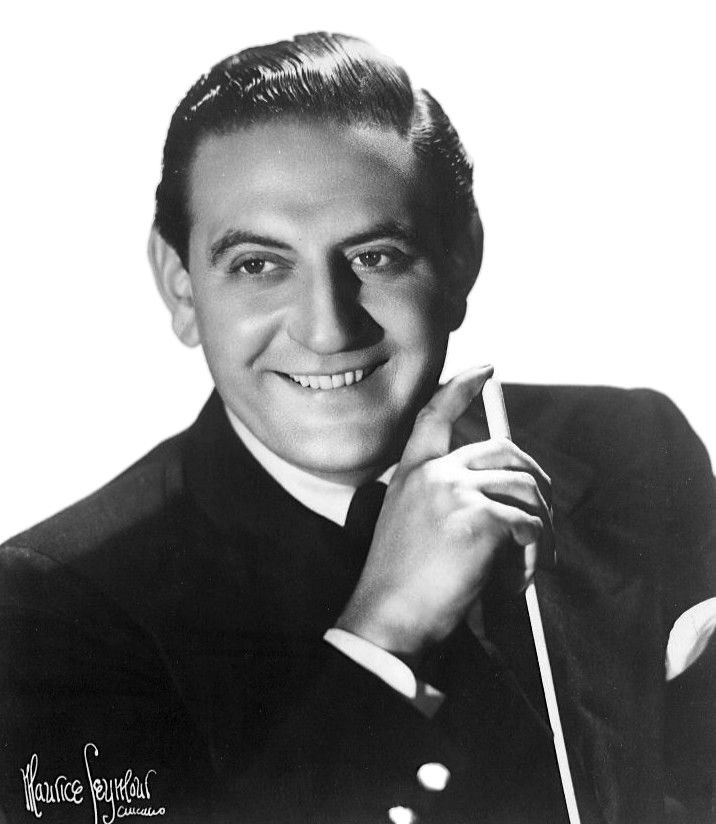
- Lombardo in 1944
- Born: Gaetano Alberto Lombardo; June 19, 1902; London, Ontario, Canada
- Died: November 5, 1977 (aged 75); Houston, Texas, U.S.
- Spouse: Lillibell Lombardo (1899–1982)
- Relatives: Six siblings, including brothers Carmen, Lebert and Victor and sister Rose Marie
- Musical career
- Genres: Sweet jazz, big band, traditional pop
- Occupations: Bandleader, musician
- Instrument: Violin
- Years active: 1924–1977

Gaetano Alberto "Guy" Lombardo (June 19, 1902 – November 5, 1977) was a Canadian and American bandleader, violinist, and hydroplane racer whose unique sweet jazz style remained popular with audiences for nearly five decades.

Lombardo formed the Royal Canadians in 1924 with his brothers Carmen, Lebert and Victor, and other musicians from his hometown. They billed themselves as creating "the sweetest music this side of Heaven". The Lombardos are believed to have sold between 100 and 300 million records during their lifetimes, many featuring the band's lead singer from 1940 onward, Kenny Gardner.

== Early life ==
Lombardo was born in London, Ontario, Canada. His parents were Italian immigrants: Gaetano Alberto who was born in Lipari, Italy (1873–1954), and Angelina Lombardo. Gaetano Sr. was employed as a tailor but was also an amateur baritone singer. He encouraged four of his five young sons to study musical instruments so that they could serve as his accompanists. Consequently, even as a young student in grammar school, Lombardo joined with his brothers to form their first orchestra. Rehearsals took place behind the family's tailor shop. Lombardo's first public appearance with his brother Carmen occurred during an outdoor lawn party at a church in London, Ontario, in 1914. The Lombardo quartet made its first significant debut at an outdoor dance pavilion in Grand Bend, Ontario, during the summer of 1919.

By 1920, Lombardo's band showcased the talents of several of his brothers including: Carmen, who was the group's music director and arranger, played lead saxophone in the distinctive four saxophone sound, led the reed section while also composing many songs, Lebert, who played lead trumpet, and subsequently Victor who played baritone sax. Guy played violin but not with his orchestra. The ensemble spent the winter season during 1922–1923 at the Winter Garden in London and the summer season of 1923 in Port Stanley, Ontario. By 1923 the Lombardo Brothers' Orchestra now included: Archie Cunningham, (saxophone), Jim Dillon (trombone), Eddie Mashurette (tuba) and Francis "Muff" Henry (guitar). In late 1923, the band ventured outside Canada on tour to Cleveland, Ohio. By 1924, the band was known as Guy Lombardo and his Royal Canadians and a two-year residency started at the Claremont Tent nightclub in Cleveland. The owner of the club (Louis Bleet) is credited with coaching Lombardo's band and assisting in developing its unique performance style. While in Cleveland, Lombardo arranged to perform on an unsponsored program for WTAM radio, which contributed to the development of a strong following for his appearances in the area. His band's first recording session occurred in Richmond, Indiana, at the Gennett Studios in early 1924. This is also where cornetist Bix Beiderbecke made his recordings in the same year.

== Royal Canadians ==
Subsequently, Lombardo's orchestra recorded twice for Brunswick. The first session took place in Cleveland in late 1926 but the recording was rejected. The second recording was accepted for the Vocalion label in early 1927. Lombardo's ensemble left the Cleveland area in 1927 for Chicago, where it appeared at the Granada Cafe and broadcast on the radio station WBBM. Soon thereafter, several lucrative recording contracts emerged. Between 1927 and 1931 Lombardo made 45 recordings on 78's for the Columbia label. These were followed by forty additional recordings upon his return to the Brunswick label in 1932 which lasted until 1934, when he joined forces with Decca (1934–35). By late 1935 an opportunity with Victor records emerged and Lombardo stayed with the label until the middle of 1938. Subsequently, he returned to Decca until 1957. Total sales from Lombardo's recordings exceeded 300 million copies by the early 1970s and supported his reputation as the leader of the most popular dance band of his era. Between 1941 and 1948, Lombardo's sister Rose Marie, the youngest of all seven Lombardo siblings, also joined the band as its first female vocalist.

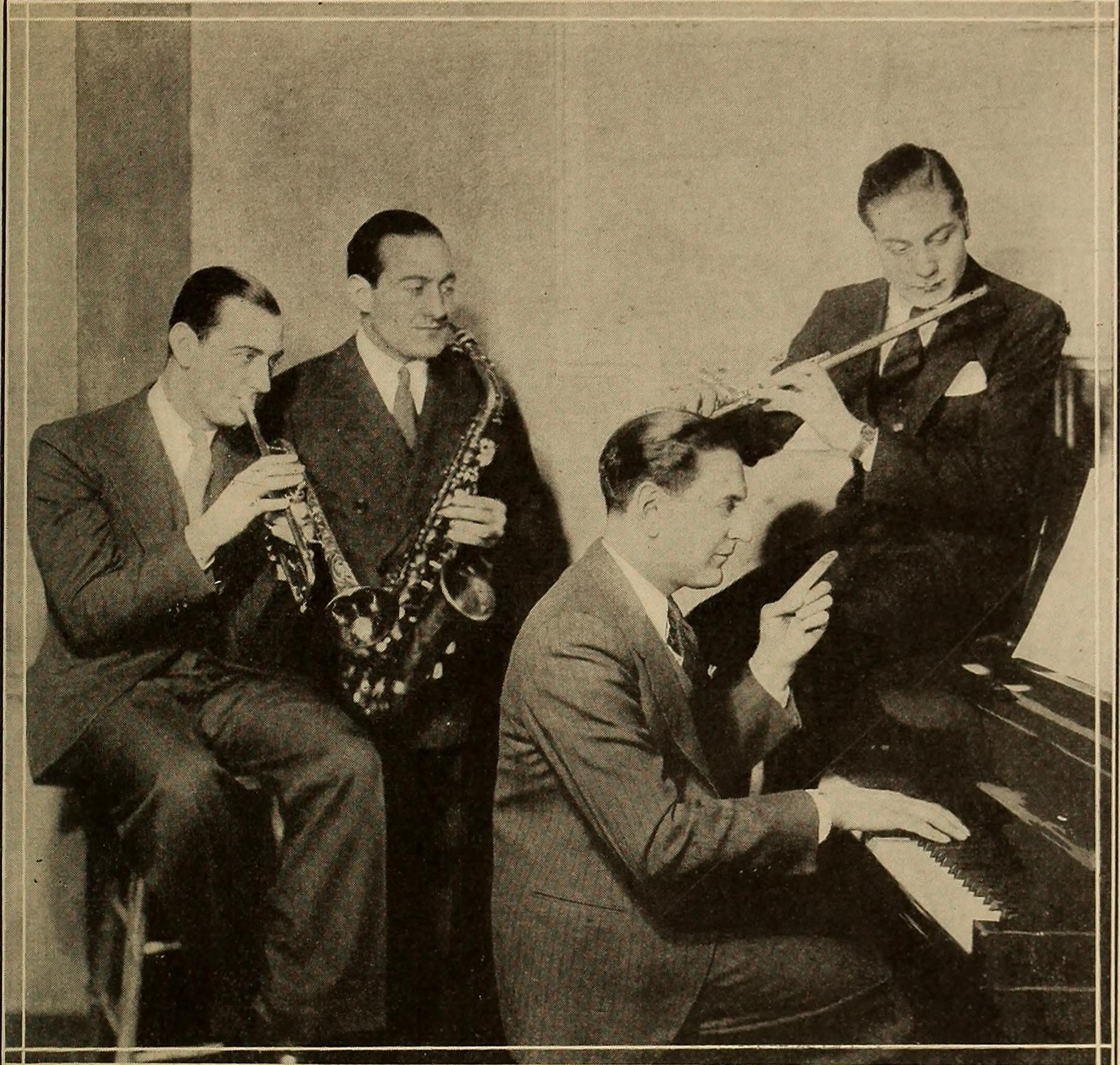
The Lombardo brothers: Lebert, Carmen, Guy, and Victor, circa 1931

Between 1927 and 1954, Lombardo & His Royal Canadians sold well above 100 million records on all labels, including Columbia, Brunswick, Decca, and RCA Victor and estimates place his total worldwide record sales between 100 and 300 million copies. This figure makes the band one of the highest selling recording groups of all time, despite the low population base and family incomes of Lombardo's prime decades.

In 1929, Lombardo began a series of appearances at the Roosevelt Grill in the Roosevelt Hotel which lasted for over three decades. He also performed in Los Angeles during the 1930s, and became a naturalized citizen of the United States in 1938. He continued to tour in major cities within both Canada and the United States after leaving the Roosevelt Hotel in 1962. Yet, despite his success as a recording artist, some jazz critics described Lombardo's "sweet" big-band style as "boring, mainstream pap." The legendary jazz trumpeter Louis Armstrong disagreed and often described Lombardo's band as his favorite orchestra. In fact, Lombardo's band enjoyed remarkable broad appeal which crossed racial boundaries. While performing at the famed Savoy Ballroom in Harlem his band even set a new attendance record in 1930.

After Guy Lombardo's death in 1977, his surviving brothers Victor and Lebert took over the Royal Canadians, though Victor left the band early in 1978 over creative differences. From 1980, the name was franchised out to various band leaders. Lebert died in 1993, passing rights to the band name to three of his six children. The band was revived in 1989 by Al Pierson and remained active as of 2021.

=== New Year's Eve radio and TV programs ===
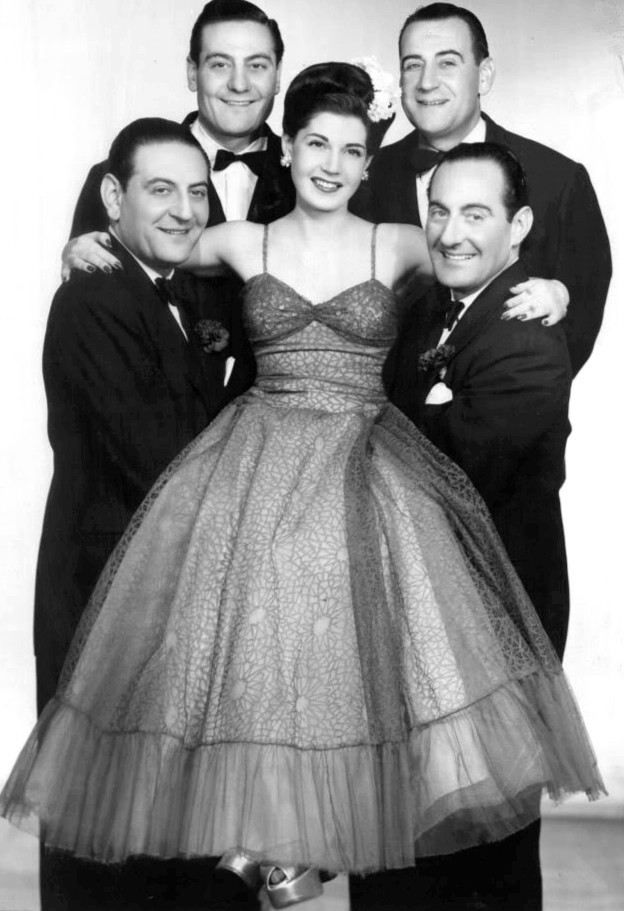
Lombardo, his brothers, and sister Rose Marie, 1954

Lombardo is perhaps best remembered for his big band remote broadcasts which were carried on several national radio and television networks for nearly fifty years. Starting in 1929, the Royal Canadians began broadcasting live from the Roosevelt Grill in the Roosevelt Hotel in New York City as "radio's first nationwide New Year's Eve broadcast". Invariably, each broadcast closed with Lombardo's rendition of the song Auld Lang Syne as part of the annual New Year's Eve tradition. The broadcasts proved to be immensely popular and continued from this venue until 1959 when they were transferred to the Grand Ballroom at the Waldorf Astoria Hotel where they continued until 1976. These radio and television broadcasts soon played a central role in New Year's celebrations across North America as millions of celebrants enjoyed the festivities within the comfort of their own homes.Time magazine even reported that the American public would simply not believe it was New Year's Day until Guy Lombardo heralded its arrival from the Waldorf-Astoria Hotel. Due to his widespread popularity, Lombardo was nicknamed "Mr. New Year's Eve" and received a citation of recognition from the United States Congress for his musical message of hope, peace and happiness for all mankind.

The band's first New Year's Eve radio broadcast was in 1929; within a few years, they were heard live on the CBS Radio Network before midnight Eastern Time, then on the NBC Radio Network after midnight. As a result, by 1954 Lombardo's popularity soared and sales of his recordings with the Royal Canadians Orchestra soon exceeded 100 million copies. He and the band played in Washington D.C. at the inaugural balls for every U.S. president from Franklin Roosevelt to Dwight Eisenhower, and the Royal Canadians would later play at Ronald Reagan's inaugural ball in 1985.

External image
- Photograph of Guy Lombardo and his wife Lillebell in the "Save Fats for Victory" campaign during World War II (1945); Here on digital.library.umkc.edu

On December 31, 1956, the Lombardo's first New Year's TV special aired on the CBS network. The program showcased live segments from New York City's Times Square and continued on New Year's Eve for two decades. CBS continued to broadcast most of Lombardo's New Year's television specials on its national network between 1965 and 1970 and the special was also syndicated live to individual TV stations. By the mid-1970s, however, competition emerged for younger audiences who preferred Dick Clark's New Year's Rockin' Eve. Nevertheless, Lombardo remained popular among older viewers.

Following Lombardo's death in 1977, his New Year's TV specials continued for an additional two years on CBS. Subsequently, Dick Clark's New Year's Rockin' Eve came into prominence. The Royal Canadians' recording of the traditional song "Auld Lang Syne" is also played as the first song of the new year in Times Square followed by "Theme from New York, New York" by Frank Sinatra, "America the Beautiful" by Ray Charles, "What a Wonderful World" by Louis Armstrong, "Over the Rainbow" by Israel Kamakawiwoʻole, and Kenny G's rendition of "Auld Lang Syne". The 1979-80 edition of New Year's Eve with Guy Lombardo's Royal Canadians moved back to syndication and only featured the celebration at the Waldorf-Astoria Hotel, with nephew Bill Lombardo leading the band for the second year. Independent station WPIX in New York City was among the local stations that aired the final Royal Canadians' New Year's Eve special to air live on television.

In September 1994, PBS taped New Year’s Eve with Guy Lombardo and His Royal Canadians, a one-hour special that was a tribute to Lombardo with clips of previous Lombardo New Year's Eve specials. Albert Pizzamiglio, better known as Al Pierson, led the Royal Canadians for this special, which aired on December 31, 1994 (no live countdown leading into 1995 was featured). Gavin MacLeod (formerly of The Love Boat) was the emcee for the special, which was taped at the Manhattan Center Studios in New York City. It also doubled as a benefit for the deaf.

=== Other radio ===
In the early 1940s Lombardo appeared as a guest on NBC's Red Network in the weekly broadcast of the "I'm An American" radio show. Presented by the United States Immigration and Naturalization Service, the program included interviews with prominent naturalized American citizens of diverse ethnic and cultural backgrounds who made exceptional contributions to American society within literature, politics, the arts and sciences. When asked to reflect upon the advantages of citizenship within America's democracy, Lombardo adeptly replied, "You don't have to be millionaires or even well-to-do to dance to good dance music in America". Also included among the honorees on the program were: Frank Capra, Albert Einstein, Thomas Mann and Kurt Weill.

Beginning June 14, 1953, Guy Lombardo and his orchestra had Guy Lombardo Time, the summer replacement for Jack Benny's radio program.

External audio
- Guy Lombardo and His Royal Canadians performing live at Harrah's Club Lake Tahoe in 1960 Guy Lombardo At Harrah's Club Here on Archive.org

=== Other television ===
In 1954, Lombardo briefly hosted a half-hour syndicated series called The Guy Lombardo Show, and in 1956 Lombardo hosted a show on CBS for three months called Guy Lombardo's Diamond Jubilee.

Guy Lombardo played himself in the hit series Route 66 in the 1963 episode “But What Do You Do in March?” In 1975, Lombardo played himself again, in the first regular episode of Ellery Queen, "The Adventure of Auld Lang Syne," which was set at a Dec. 31, 1946 New Year's Eve gathering.

=== Film ===
As early as 1933, Lombardo appeared with his brothers Carmen, Lebert and Victor performing in the film Rambling 'Round Radio Row for Warner Brothers' Vitaphone division. Lombardo and his orchestra were also part of the 1934 film Many Happy Returns.

=== Jones Beach Theater ===
At the express invitation of Robert Moses, Lombardo served for two decades, as the impresario for numerous summer stock revivals of leading Broadway musicals at the Jones Beach Theater on the south shore of New York's Long Island. Beginning in 1954 with a production of Arabian Nights starring the operatic tenor Lauritz Melchior, Lombardo also collaborated with the producer Arnold Spector and choreographer June Taylor in 1964 to produce Around the World in 80 Days and continued to create opulent revivals of several Broadway musicals until 1977. He would often commute from his home in Freeport, Long Island to the lagoon adjacent to the theater on his yacht The Tempo IV to conduct his Royal Canadians Orchestra for dances in the Schaeffer Beer Tent after the shows.

Lombardo's productions at the seaside theater were noted for their glamorous and realistic waterborne set designs as well as their lush musical scores which were sometimes arranged by his brother Carmen. His early revival of Song of Norway in 1958 featured an actual iceberg floating down the lagoon toward the stage along with an authentic Viking ship. His 1961 rendition of the Hawaiian musical fantasy Paradise Island featured 32 native Hawaiian dancers diving off towers into the lagoon adjacent to the theater along with a 100 foot high waterfall. The 1965 production of Mardis Gras incorporated a floating set which ushered Louis Armstrong onstage for musical performances with his own band.

External image
- Photograph of Jones Beach Theater's production of Fiddler on the Roof in 1974; Here on New York State Archives: Digital Collections

Over the decades, Lombardo also collaborated with leading musical artists in his revivals including: Nancy Dussault in the 1968 production of South Pacific, Constance Towers in the 1970 production of The Sound of Music, and Norman Atkins in the 1974 production of Fiddler on the Roof. From the realm of grand opera, Lombardo recruited such luminaries as Jerome Hines and James McCracken along with members of the New York City Ballet. He also enlisted talented actors from the Broadway stage including William Gaxton and Arthur Treacher for his production of Paradise Island in 1961 and the film actor Jules Munshin for his 1960 production of Hit the Deck. During the early years, members of Lombardo's fifteen original Royal Canadians were augmented by professional musicians recruited from the New York City area to serve within the pit orchestra as well as on stage. As a result, the orchestra itself often included between thirty and forty accomplished instrumentalists.

Lombardo often faced many challenges in the course of producing extravaganzas in such an outdoor venue during the summer season. The fickle weather conditions which prevailed near the shoreline often featured spontaneous drenching downpours which discouraged concertgoers. Still others balked at the prospect of making a long road trip from New York City onto Long Island for a show. In addition, complex negotiations with a variety of unions representing the stagehands, carpenters and electricians contributed to mounting production costs. Ultimately, the Lombardo brothers only broke even financially, despite years of dedicated service. Lombardo, however, did not have any regrets. In the final analysis his primary objective was to provide ordinary members of the general public with musical entertainment of the highest possible caliber, while also ensuring memorable nights of dancing pleasure to the strains of "the sweetest music this side of heaven".

== Hydroplane racing ==
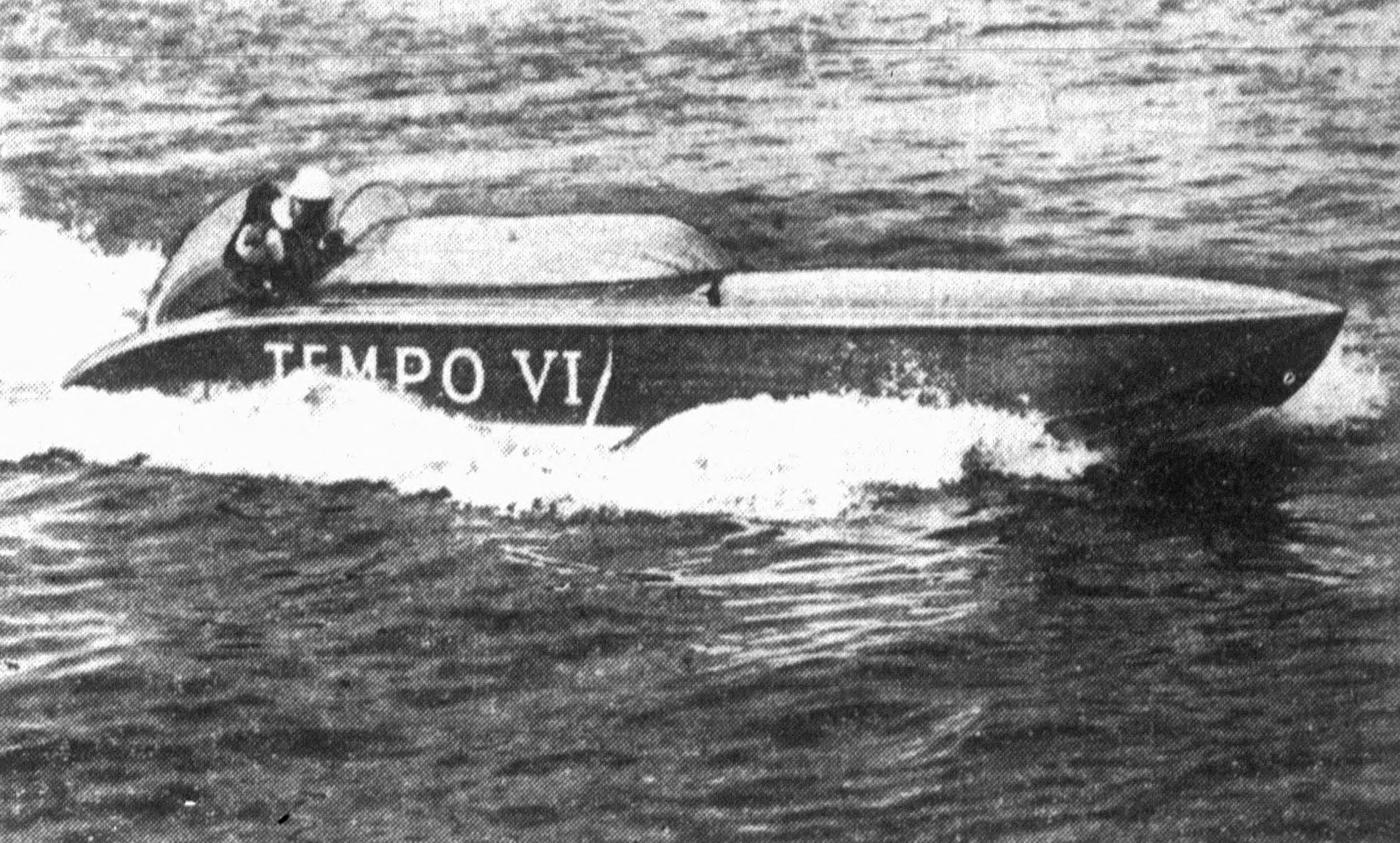
Lombardo at the helm of Tempo VI, circa 1947.

Lombardo's talents also extended beyond the realm of jazz music. He was also an active nautical enthusiast and participated in the sport of Step Boat speedboat racing. In 1946, he piloted his speedboat "Tempo VI" to victory, winning the Gold Cup. For a time, Lombardo even reigned as the U.S. national champion (1946–1949), utilizing a boat designed specifically for him and manufactured by John L. Hacker. He subsequently achieved victory in several other important races including: the Ford Memorial competition (1948), President's Cup (1952) as well as the Silver Cup in 1952. By the late 1950s, Lombardo had won every trophy in the field and retired from active competition. This followed his attempt in 1959 to utilize a jet engine-powered Tempo Alcoa to exceed the absolute water speed record. During a test run, the radio-controlled craft was destroyed while it surpassed a velocity of 250 mph. These numerous achievements led to his induction into the Canadian Motorsport Hall of Fame in 2002.

Lombardo also unveiled a robust line of fiberglass boats in 1958. Branded as the "Guy Lombardo Royal Fleet", these crafts were both manufactured and marketed by a subsidiary of the U. S. Pools Co. in Newark, New Jersey. in accordance with a license from the Skagit Plastics Co. of La Conner, Washington. Several years later, however, in 1961 the project was abandoned and Skagit Plastics discontinued production.

Later in life, Lombardo retired near the seashore at his home on the south shore of New York's Long Island in Freeport, where he docked his speedboats: Tempo, Tempo VI, and Tempo VII. The home has been designated as a historical landmark. In keeping with his nautical interests, he also invested in a nearby seafood restaurant called "Liota's East Point House" that eventually became "Guy Lombardo's East Point House".

== Personal life ==
While playing at the Music Box in Cleveland, Lombardo met Lillibeth Glenn. They married in 1926.

== Death ==
On November 5, 1977, Lombardo died of a heart attack. Another source says he died "of a lung ailment" following heart surgery. A spokesman from the hospital said it was "respiratory insufficiency" relating to a pulmonary problem. His wife, who died in 1982, was at his bedside when he died in Houston Methodist Hospital. He is interred at the Pinelawn Memorial Park in East Farmingdale, New York.

== Bibliography ==
Included among the books published about Guy Lombardo and his Royal Canadians Orchestra are the following:

- Cline, Beverly Fink (1979). The Lombardo Story. Toronto: Musson Books. ISBN 978-0-9868763-1-8.
- Herndon, B. (1964). The Sweetest Music This Side of Heaven. New York: McGraw Hill.
- Lombardo, Guy; Altshul, Jack (1975). Auld Acquaintance. New York: Doubleday. ISBN 978-0-385-02863-9.

== Tributes ==
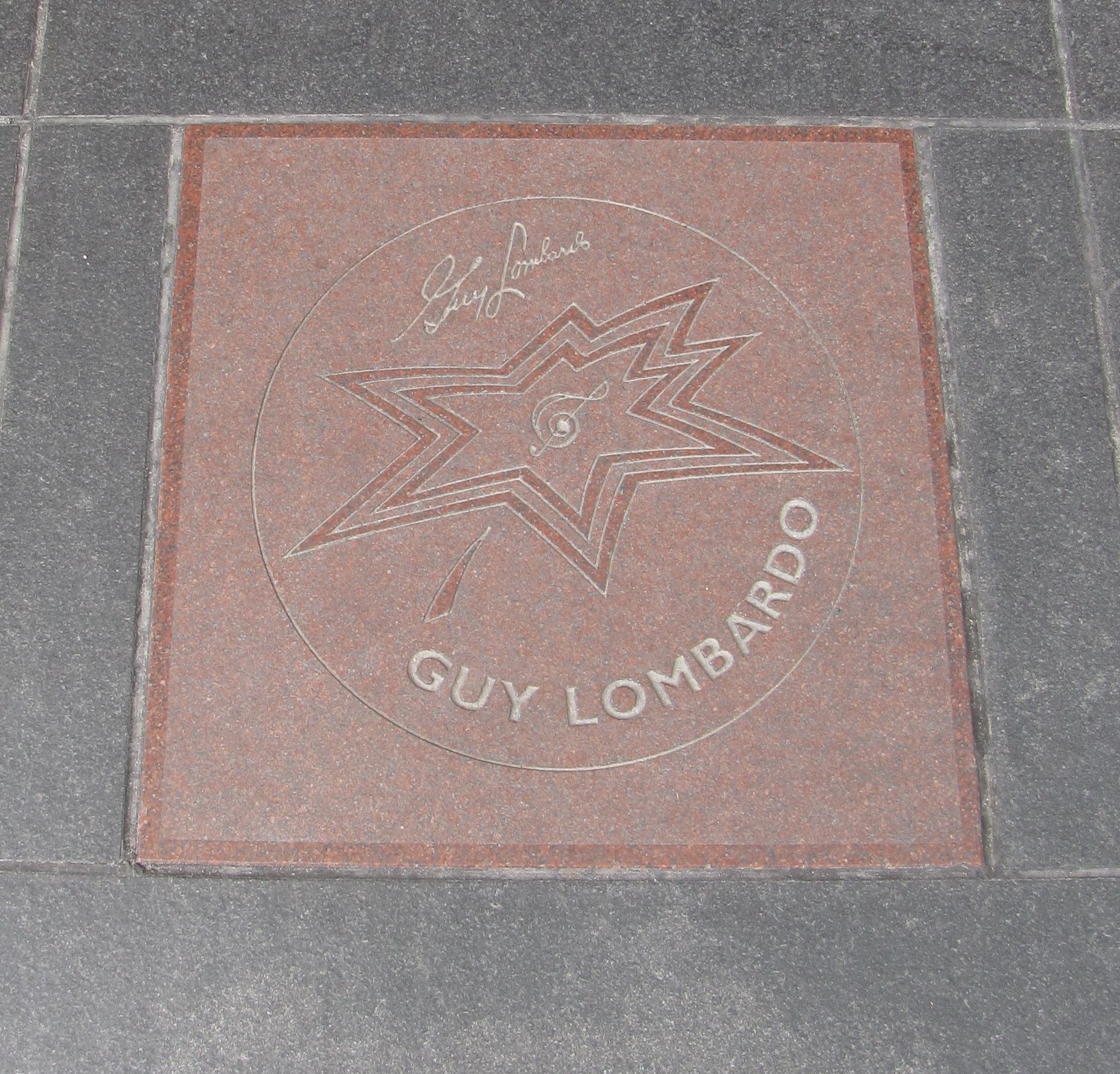
Guy Lombardo's star on Canada's Walk of Fame in Toronto

In 1971 the United States Congress honored Guy Lombardo with an official recognition of his humanitarian accomplishments. In the same year he was awarded an honorary Doctorate of Music by the University of Western Ontario.

The Long Island Music and Entertainment Hall of Fame inducted Guy Lombardo in 2008.

Lombardo was featured on a postage stamp issued on December 17, 1999, as part of Canada Post's Millennium Collection.

Guy Lombardo has three stars on the Hollywood Walk of Fame in Los Angeles.

In 2002, he was inducted into Canada's Walk of Fame and had a star on its Walk of Fame in Toronto. In 1978, the Canadian Music Hall of Fame also inducted Guy Lombardo.

In his later home of Freeport, New York, there is Guy Lombardo Avenue. There is a bridge named after Lombardo in London, Ontario, near Wonderland Gardens, as well as Lombardo Avenue in north London near the University of Western Ontario.

The Guy Lombardo Society was created to preserve the music and history of Guy Lombardo and His Royal Canadians.

== Guy Lombardo museum ==
From the mid-1980s until 2007, there was a museum dedicated to Guy Lombardo in London, Ontario, near the intersection of Wonderland Road and Springbank Drive. In September 2007, lacking visitors and funding, the museum was closed. Although the city owned many of the exhibits, most of the collection can be found at the private home of former part-time curator Douglas Flood. City staff recommended that the museum not be reopened. In early 2015 Flood scheduled an auction of remaining items from the collection, under protest from members of the Lombardo family.

Lebert Lombardo's children also have an extensive collection of artifacts, including photographs, record albums, sheet music, awards, and the band's framed first paycheck from 1918 in their homes and storage units in Fort Myers and Sanibel, Florida. They have tried to donate the collection to various universities and museums but have had no takers. The Library of Congress has a collection of Lombardo films.

== Performance style ==
External audio
- Interviews with Guy Lombardo and performances on CBC Radio 1's "Rewind" in 2015 Here on Archive.org'

Over the decades, performances and recordings by Guy Lombardo's Royal Canadians Orchestra were reviewed by critics in such noted magazines as: The Billboard, the New York Times Theater Reviews. and the New York Herald Tribune Book Reviews. Lombardo was cited for his skillful use of muted drums, trumpets and clarinets, bright tempos and smooth, flowing melodic lines. While emphasizing a sedate performance style, Lombardo also discouraged the use of solo improvisations, riffs and driving swing rhythms in his arrangements. He also adopted the use of the tuba instead of the double bass in a harmonic role.

In a 1973 interview with CBC radio, Lombardo credited his brother Carmen with utilizing his talents as a self-taught flautist to develop a unique "round" sound for the saxophones as well as the influence of Paul Whiteman's band on his style. His "sweet" jazz style frequently incorporated lilting arrangements, much to the dismay of "serious" jazz devotees who favored "hot" jazz. Ironically, even the executives at Columbia Records were inclined to reject a sample recording submitted by Lombardo's band in 1927 on the grounds that it lacked the fast staccato tempo popularized by dance bands in the 1920s and was therefore not suitable for dancing.

Nevertheless, even Lombardo's detractors praised his orchestra for the skill and musicianship of its members. In fact, Lombardo's band was highly respected throughout the industry for its professionalism. Milt Gabler of Decca Records praised the band as "the most completely responsible band I ever knew." The legendary Louis Armstrong even singled out Lombardo's band as one of his favorites.

While Benny Goodman insisted that sweet music in general was "a weak sister incapable of holding its own in any artistic encounter with the real music of America", Lombardo's style continued to reign as the dominant influence among dance bands from the late 1920s until the arrival of the Swing Era in the mid-1930s and served as the foundation for the styles developed by Hal Kemp, Kay Kyser, Freddie Martin (who studied technique on the saxophone with Carmen Lombardo) and Sammy Kaye. In fact, Lombardo's smooth, mellow, lyrical style never quite disappeared even after World War II ended and helped to influence the subsequent development of various musical genres including easy listening.

The music critic Winthrop Sargeant brushed aside all doubts about Lombardo's music In his Jazz: Hot and Hybrid (1959:53) by asserting that it was "unquestionably a variety of jazz, a hybrid variety that has come as close as anything does to being the folk-music of the great mass of Americans". In the final analysis, Lombardo's simple direct interpretation of easily understood melodies continued to consistently attract huge audiences both in the dance halls and concert halls of America in a manner which remained popular with the public for five decades.

== Singles discography ==
Over the decades, Lombardo and his Royal Canadians Orchestra recorded extensively on the Brunswick, Victor, Columbia and Decca record labels. Before the start of Billboard magazine's top 40 charts in 1940, Lombardo had over 140 hits from 1927 to 1940, including twenty-one No. 1 singles. The five biggest being "Charmaine", "It Looks Like Rain in Cherry Blossom Lane", "Boo-Hoo", "We Just Couldn't Say Goodbye", and "Red Sails in the Sunset".

The following singles made the "Top Ten" of the American Billboard singles charts from 1927 to 1940:

=== Columbia ===
The following appeared on the Columbia Records label:

- 1927 – Charmaine
- 1928 – Beloved
- 1928 – Coquette
- 1928 – Sweethearts on Parade
- 1929 – College Medley Fox Trot (The Big Ten)
- 1929 – I Get the Blues When It Rains
- 1929 – Singin' in the Bathtub
- 1929 – Where the Shy Little Violets Grow
- 1930 – A Cottage for Sale
- 1930 – Baby's Birthday Party
- 1930 – Confessin' (That I Love You)
- 1930 – Crying for the Carolines
- 1930 – Go Home and Tell Your Mother
- 1930 – Have a Little Faith in Me
- 1930 – I Still Get a Thrill (Thinking of You)
- 1930 – Lazy Lou'siana Moon
- 1930 – Rollin' Down the River
- 1930 – Singing a Song to the Stars
- 1930 – Swingin' in a Hammock
- 1930 – Under a Texas Moon
- 1930 – You're Driving Me Crazy (What Did I Do)
- 1930 – You're the Sweetest Girl This Side of Heaven
- 1931 – (There Ought to Be a) Moonlight Saving Time
- 1931 – Begging for Love
- 1931 – By the River Sainte-Marie
- 1931 – Goodnight Sweetheart
- 1931 – Now That You're Gone
- 1931 – Sweet and Lovely
- 1931 – Whistling in the Dark
- 1931 – Without That Gal!
- 1931 – You Try Somebody Else (We'll Be Back Together Again)

=== Brunswick ===
The following appeared on the Brunswick Records label:

- 1932 – How Deep Is the Ocean
- 1932 – I'll Never Be the Same
- 1932 – I'm Sure of Everything But You
- 1932 – Just a Little Home for the Old Folks
- 1932 – Lawd, You Made The Night Too Long
- 1932 – My Extraordinary Gal
- 1932 – Paradise
- 1932 – Pink Elephants
- 1932 – Puh–Leeze, Mr. Hemingway
- 1932 – Too Many Tears
- 1932 – Waltzing in a Dream
- 1932 – We Just Couldn't Say Goodbye
- 1933 – By a Waterfall
- 1933 – Did You Ever See a Dream Walking?
- 1933 – Don't Blame Me
- 1933 – Going, Going, Gone!
- 1933 – Lover
- 1933 – Stormy Weather
- 1933 – Street of Dreams
- 1933 – The Last Round–Up
- 1933 – This Time It's Love
- 1934 – Fare Thee Well
- 1934 – My Old Flame
- 1934 – Night on the Water
- 1934 – Stars Fell on Alabama

=== Decca (1934–1935) ===
The following appeared on the Decca Records label:

- 1934 – Winter Wonderland
- 1934 – Annie Doesn't Live Here Anymore
- 1935 – Broadway Rhythm
- 1935 – Cheek to Cheek
- 1935 – I'm Sittin' High on a Hill Top
- 1935 – Red Sails in the Sunset
- 1935 – Seein' Is Believin'
- 1935 – What's the Reason (I'm Not Pleasin' You)

=== Victor (1936–1938) ===
- 1936 – Lost
- 1936 – The Broken Record
- 1936 – The Way You Look Tonight
- 1936 – When Did You Leave Heaven
- 1936 – When My Dream Boat Comes Home
- 1937 – A Sail Boat in the Moonlight
- 1937 – Boo–Hoo
- 1937 – I Know Now
- 1937 – It Looks Like Rain in Cherry Blossom Lane
- 1937 – September in the Rain
- 1937 – So Rare
- 1937 – The Love Bug Will Bite You
- 1938 – Bei Mir Bist Du Schoen
- 1938 – I Must See Annie Tonight
- 1938 – It's a Lonely Trail (When You're Travelin' All Alone)
- 1938 – Let's Sail to Dreamland
- 1938 – Little Lady Make Believe
- 1938 – So Little Time
- 1938 – Ti–Pi–Tin

=== Decca (1939–1952) ===
- 1939 – Cinderella Stay in My Arms
- 1939 – Deep Purple
- 1939 – I Ups to Her and She Ups to Me
- 1939 – I'm Sorry for Myself
- 1939 – In an 18th Century Drawing Room
- 1939 – Little Sir Echo
- 1939 – Penny Serenade
- 1939 – South American Way
- 1939 – South of the Border
- 1939 – The Umbrella Man

The following singles made the "Top Ten" of the Billboard Singles Charts, 1940–1952.

- 1940 – "Confucius Say"
- 1940 – "When You Wish Upon A Star"
- 1941 – "The Band Played On"
- 1942 – "Johnny Doughboy Found a Rose in Ireland"
- 1944 – "Speak Low"
- 1944 – "It's Love-Love-Love"
- 1944 – "Together"
- 1945 – "Always"
- 1945 – "A Little on the Lonely Side"
- 1945 – "Bell Bottom Trousers"
- 1945 – "June Is Bustin' Out All Over"
- 1945 – "No Can Do"
- 1946 – "Seems Like Old Times"
- 1946 – "Symphony"
- 1946 – "Money Is the Root of All Evil"
- 1946 – "Shoo-Fly Pie and Apple Pan Dowdy"
- 1946 – "The Gypsy"
- 1946 – "Christmas Island"
- 1947 – "Managua-Nicaragua"
- 1947 – "Anniversary Song"
- 1947 – "April Showers"
- 1947 – "I Wonder, I Wonder, I Wonder"
- 1948 – "I'm My Own Grandpaw"
- 1949 – "Red Roses for a Blue Lady"
- 1950 – "Enjoy Yourself (It's Later Than You Think)"
- 1950 – "The Third Man Theme"
- 1950 – "Dearie"
- 1950 – "All My Love (Bolero)"
- 1950 – "Harbor Lights"
- 1950 – "The Tennessee Waltz"
- 1952 – "Blue Tango"

== Albums discography ==
During the 1950s and 1960s Lombardo and his Royal Canadians recorded several albums for the Decca, Capitol, London and Pickwick record labels.

Decca:

- Decca DL 9014 Guy Lombardo Presents Arabian Nights (1954)
- Decca DL 8070 A Night At The Roosevelt With Guy Lombardo & His Royal Canadians (1954)
- Decca DL 8097 Lombardoland USA (1955)
- Decca DL 8119 Guy Lombardo & His Twin Pianos (1955)
- Decca DL 8135 Soft and Sweet (1955)
- Decca DL 8136 Enjoy Yourself (1955)
- Decca DL 8205 Waltztime (1956)
- Decca DL 8208 The Band Played On (1956)
- Decca DL 8249 Lombardoland Volume 1 (1956)
- Decca DL 8251 Twin Piano Magic (1956)
- Decca DL 8254 Everybody Dance to the Music (1956)
- Decca DL 8255 Oh, How We Danced... (1956)
- Decca DL 8256 Waltzland (1956)
- Decca DL 8333 Silver Jubilee (1956)
- Decca DL 8354 Jingle Bells (1956)
- Decca DXM 154 The Sweetest Music This Side of Heaven Vols. 1–4 (1957)
- Decca DL 8843 Instrumentally Yours (1959)
- Decca DL 8894 Sidewalks of New York (1959)
- Decca DL 8895 Movieland Melodies (1959)
- Decca DL 8898 Show Tunes (1959)
- Decca DL 8962 Sweetest Music This Side of Heaven, A Musical Autobiography 1926–1932 (1960)
- Decca DL 4123 The Sweetest Pianos This Side of Heaven (1960)
- Decca DL 4149 Far Away Places (1962)
- Decca DL 4117 New Year's Eve with Guy Lombardo & His Royal Canadians (1962)
- Decca DL 4180 Dance to the Songs Everybody Knows (1962)
- Decca DL 4229 The Sweetest Music This Side of Heaven 1932–1939 (1962)
- Decca DL 4268 The Best Songs Are the Old Songs (1962)
- Decca DL 4280 By Special Request (1962)
- Decca DL 4288 Dancing Piano (1962)
- Decca DL 4328 The Sweetest Music This Side of Heaven 1941–1948 (1963)
- Decca DL 4329 The Sweetest Music This Side of Heaven 1949–1954 (1963)
- Decca DL 4371 Play A Happy Song (1963)
- Decca DL 4380 Golden Minstrel Songs for Dancing (1963)
- Decca DL 4430 Golden Folk Songs for Dancing (1963)
- Decca DL 4516 Italian Songs Everybody Knows (1964)
- Decca DXB 185 The Best of Guy Lombardo & His Royal Canadians (1964)
- Decca DL 4567 Snuggled on Your Shoulder (1964)
- Decca DL 4593 Golden Medleys (1965)
- Decca DL 4735 Dance Medley Time (1966)
- Decca DL 4812 Guy Lombardo's Greatest Hits (1967)

Vocalion:

- VL 3605 Dance in the Moonlight (1958)
- VL 3833 Here's Guy Lombardo (1968)

Capitol:

- Capitol W 738 Guy Lombardo in Hi-Fi (1956)
- Capitol T 739 Your Guy Lombardo Medley Vol. 1 (1956)
- Capitol T 788 A Decade on Broadway 1946–1956 (1956)
- Capitol T 892 Lively Guy (1957)
- Capitol T 916 A Decade on Broadway 1935–1945 (1958)
- Capitol ST 1019 Berlin by Lombardo (1959)
- Capitol ST 1121 Dancing Room Only (1959)
- Capitol ST 1191 Lombardo Goes Latin (1959)
- Capitol ST 1244 Your Guy Lombardo Medley Vol. 2 (1960)
- Capitol ST 1306 The Sweetest Waltzes This Side of Heaven (1960)(reissued as SF522)
- Capitol ST 1393 Lombardo at Harrah's Club (1960)
- Capitol SKAO Sing The Songs of Christmas (1960)
- Capitol ST 1453 Bells Are Ringing (1960)
- Capitol ST 1461 The Best of Guy Lombardo (1961)
- Capitol ST 1593 Drifting and Dreaming (1961)
- Capitol ST 1598 Your Guy Lombardo Medley Vol. 3 (1961)
- Capitol ST 1648 Guy Lombardo & The Royal Canadians Go Dixie (1962)
- Capitol ST 1738 Waltzing with Guy Lombardo (1962)
- Capitol 1843 Lombardo with a Beat (1963)
- Capitol ST 1947 The Sweetest Medleys This Side of Heaven (1963)
- Capitol ST 2052 Lombardo Touch (1964)
- Capitol STDL The Lombardo Years (1964)
- Capitol T 2298 Guy Lombardo Presents Kenny Gardner (1965)
- Capitol T 2350 Guy Lombardo Plays Songs of Carmen Lombardo (1965)
- Capitol ST 2481 A Wonderful Year (1966)
- Capitol ST 2559 Guy Lombardo's Broadway (1966)
- Capitol ST 2639 The Sweetest Sounds Today (1967)
- Capitol ST 2777 Lombardo Country (1967)
- Capitol ST 2825 Medleys On Parade (1967)
- Capitol ST 2889 They're Playing Our Songs (1968)
- Capitol SKAO 2940 The Best of Guy Lombardo Vol. 2 (1968)
- Capitol ST 128 The New Songs The New Sounds
- Capitol SM 340 Recorded Live at The Tropicana

London Records:

- London XPS904 Every Night Is New Year's Eve with Guy Lombardo & His Royal Canadians at The Waldorf Astoria (1973)

Pickwick (Capitol) Budget Compilations / Reissues:

- SPC 1011 – Deck the Halls
- SPC 3073 – Sweet and Heavenly
- SPC 3140 – Taking a Chance On Love
- SPC 3193 – Enjoy Yourself
- SPC 3257 – Red Roses for a Blue Lady
- SPC 3312 – The Impossible Dream
- SPC 3358 – Alley Cat
- ACL 7057 – Guy Lombardo Plays (1977 reissue of RCA Camden CAL255, 1965)

== See also ==
- Carmen Lombardo
- Lebert Lombardo
- Victor Lombardo
- Music of Canada
