= Rockin' Chair (1929 song) =

Song by Hoagy Carmichael
- Recorded: February 19th, 1929
- Genre: Jazz
- Length: 3:36.
- Songwriter: Hoagy Carmichael

"Rockin' Chair is a 1929 popular song with lyrics and music composed by Hoagy Carmichael. Musically it is unconventional, as after the B section when most popular songs return to A, this song has an A-B-C-A^{1} structure. Carmichael recorded the song in 1929, 1930, and 1956. Mildred Bailey made it famous by using it as her theme song. Like other 1920s standards, "Rockin' Chair" relied on the stereotypes of minstrelsy, citing "Aunt Harriet" from the anti-Uncle Tom song "Aunt Harriet Becha Stowe" (1853).

The song was first recorded on February 19, 1929, by Hoagy Carmichael as a test for Victor Records, but not released at the time. This recording was later released on the Historical label as HLA-37. This version is sung by only one vocalist. Hoagy Carmichael and his Orchestra recorded a new version on May 21, 1930, featuring Bix Beiderbecke on cornet. This second version is with two vocalists (Carmichael and Irving Brodsky) and was released on Victor Records as V-38139B. Louis Armstrong recorded it with Hoagy Carmichael on vocals on December 13, 1929, at Okeh studios after the stock market crashed, giving a badly needed boost to Carmichael's finances. The recording was released as Okeh 8756 in 1930 and became popular in 1932. The song utilises "call and response" to create a dialog between an aged father and his son. Armstrong performed and recorded "Rockin' Chair" numerous times in his career with his trombonist Jack Teagarden. Armstrong's recording history with the song includes a recording from as late as 1971.

Mildred Bailey first recorded the song on August 18, 1932, for Bluebird Records (catalog No. 6945), and later for Vocalion Records (catalog No. 3553). The latter recording was a hit in 1937. She became known as "The Rockin' Chair Lady". Other popular versions in 1932 were by The Mills Brothers, and by Louis Armstrong with Hoagy Carmichael.

== Other versions ==
- Paul Robeson (1931).
- Anita Boyer backed by the King Cole Trio - recorded February 25, 1941
- Jo Stafford – recorded November 29, 1944, but not issued until 2007.
- Frankie Laine – a single release for Mercury Records (catalog No. 1180), recorded June 7, 1949 and later for his album Rockin' (1957)
- Patti Page – Page Two – Sings a Collection of Her Most Famous Songs (1956).
- Kay Starr – Rockin' with Kay (1958).
- The Mills Brothers – The Mills Brothers – Great Hits (1958).
- Ed Townsend released a version of the song on his 1959 album, New in Town.
- Matt Monro – Matt Monro Sings Hoagy Carmichael (1962).
- Lou Rawls – Tobacco Road (1964).
- Harry James recorded a version in 1964 on his album In a Relaxed Mood (MGM E-4274).
- Maria Muldaur recorded it (with vocal bantering with Carmichael himself)) for her third solo album Sweet Harmony (Reprise, MS-2235, 1976).
- Jerry Garcia and David Grisman Recorded a progressive bluegrass version for their 1991 album Jerry Garcia / David Grisman.
- Crystal Gayle – for her album Crystal Gayle Sings the Heart and Soul of Hoagy Carmichael (1999)
- Rosemary Clooney – Sentimental Journey: The Girl Singer and Her New Big Band (2001)
- Derek Bailey (guitarist) – from his album Ballads (2002)
- Richard Thompson recorded the song on his 1000 Years of Popular Music album. (2003)
- Eric Clapton released his version of the song in 2010 on his self-titled album Clapton.

== See also ==
- List of 1920s jazz standards
