= Managua, Nicaragua (song) =

1946 song

"Managua, Nicaragua" is a popular American song from 1946, whose music was written by Irving Fields, and lyrics by Albert Gamse.

== Recordings in 1946 and 1947 ==
- The recording by Freddy Martin's orchestra (vocal by Stuart Wade and ensemble) was released by RCA Victor Records as catalog number 20-2026. It first reached the Billboard magazine Best Seller chart on January 31, 1947, and lasted 11 weeks on the chart, peaking at #1. Martin described their arrangement as straight fox trot with emphasis on the vocals.
- The recording by Guy Lombardo's orchestra (vocal by Don Rodney) was recorded on November 15, 1946, and released by Decca Records as catalog number 23782. It first reached the Billboard magazine Best Seller chart on February 14, 1947, and lasted 9 weeks on the chart, peaking at #4.
- The recording by Kay Kyser's orchestra (vocal by Gloria Wood & The Campus Kids) was released by Columbia Records as catalog number 37214. It first reached the Billboard magazine Best Seller chart on March 7, 1947 and lasted 2 weeks on the chart, peaking at #9.

== Featured in film ==
"Managua, Nicaragua" is heard briefly in the classic film The Third Man, but in an instrumental version.

Preceded by "Open the Door, Richard" by Count Basie	U.S. Billboard Best Sellers in Stores number-one single (Freddy Martin version); March 1–8, 1947	Succeeded by "Heartaches" by Ted Weems
