= White Christmas (Rosemary Clooney album) =

Studio album by Rosemary Clooney
- Released: October 15, 1996
- Recorded: 1996
- Genre: Pop
- Length: 54:44
- Label: Concord
- Producer: John Burk

Rosemary Clooney chronology
Dedicated to Nelson (1996)	White Christmas (1996)	Mothers & Daughters (1997)

Professional ratings
Review scores
Source	Rating
AllMusic	3/5 stars

White Christmas is a 1996 studio album by Rosemary Clooney. This was Clooney's third Christmas album. She had previously appeared in the 1954 holiday film White Christmas. Clooney is accompanied by a big band on the album.

== Track listing ==
1. "The Christmas Song" (Mel Tormé, Bob Wells) – 3:50
2. "Let It Snow! Let It Snow! Let It Snow!" (Sammy Cahn, Jule Styne) – 3:10
3. "Joy to the World" (Lowell Mason, Isaac Watts) – 0:42
4. "I'll Be Home for Christmas" (Kim Gannon, Walter Kent, Buck Ram) – 3:31
5. "It's the Most Wonderful Time of the Year" (Edward Pola, George Wyle) 2:20
6. "Have Yourself a Merry Little Christmas" (Ralph Blane, Hugh Martin) – 3:31
7. "Christmas Love Song" (Alan Bergman, Marilyn Bergman, Johnny Mandel) – 3:29
8. "The First Noël" (William B. Sandys) – 0:50
9. "Winter Wonderland" (Felix Bernard, Richard B. Smith) – 2:46
10. "Christmas Time Is Here" (Vince Guaraldi, Lee Mendelson) – 3:10
11. "Christmas Mem'ries" (A. Bergman, M. Bergman, Don Costa) – 3:51
12. "Rudolph the Red-Nosed Reindeer" (Johnny Marks) – 1:02
13. "The Spirit of Christmas" (Tom Adair, Matt Dennis) – 4:32
14. "Santa Claus Is Coming to Town"/"Hey Kris Kringle" (J. Fred Coots, Haven Gillespie)/(Coots, Gillespie) – 2:39
15. "Count Your Blessings (Instead of Sheep)" (Irving Berlin) – 3:24
16. "O Little Town of Bethlehem" (Phillips Brooks, Lewis Redner) – 0:58
17. "The Christmas Waltz" (Cahn, Styne) – 2:44
18. "White Christmas" (Berlin) – 3:34
19. "Silent Night" (Franz Gruber, Josef Mohr) – 1:19
20. "Sleep Well, Little Children" (A. Bergman, Leon Klatzkin) – 2:14
21. "Don't Wait Till the Night Before Christmas" (Abel Baer, Sam M. Lewis) – 1:25

== Personnel ==
- Rosemary Clooney – vocal
