= John Jacob Loeb =

American composer (1910–1970)

- Born: 1910; Chicago, Illinois, U.S.
- Died: March 2, 1970 (aged 59–60); Valley Stream, New York, U.S.
- Occupation: Composer
- Years active: 1940s
- Style: Traditional pop

John Jacob Loeb (1910 – March 2, 1970) was an American composer. He wrote music and lyrics for many popular songs, such as "Rosie the Riveter" (1942), "Seems Like Old Times" (1945), "Masquerade", "Reflections in the Water", "Sweetie Pie", "Boo Hoo", "A Sailboat in the Moonlight", and "The Maharajah of Magador".

Born in Chicago, Loeb started composing songs in 1928 while attending Lawrence Woodmere Academy. After he left school, Loeb worked briefly for his father at Eliel, Loeb and Company, the family insurance brokerage firm. He later became a member of the American Society of Composers, Authors and Publishers (ASCAP) in 1932. Loeb collaborated with Carmen Lombardo, Paul Francis Webster, and Edward Lane.

He died on 2 March 1970 at Franklin General Hospital in Valley Stream, New York.

Loeb was also the cousin of Richard Loeb, one half of the "thrill killing duo" Leopold and Loeb.
