= Mothers & Daughters (album) =

Studio album by Rosemary Clooney
- Released: April 22, 1997
- Recorded: 1996
- Genre: Jazz
- Length: 54:44
- Label: Concord
- Producer: John Burk

Rosemary Clooney chronology
White Christmas (1996)	Mothers & Daughters (1997)	At Long Last (1998)

Professional ratings
Review scores
Source	Rating
AllMusic	1.5/5 stars

Mothers & Daughters is a 1997 studio album by Rosemary Clooney.

== Track listing ==
1. "Thank Heaven for Little Girls" (Alan Jay Lerner, Frederick Loewe) – 3:28
2. "Always" (Irving Berlin) – 3:44
3. "That Face" (Alan Bergman, Lew Spence) – 3:06
4. "Baby Mine" (Frank Churchill, Ned Washington) – 4:27
5. "The Best Gift" (Lan O'Kun) – 2:00
6. "Maria" (Leonard Bernstein, Stephen Sondheim) – 3:28
7. "God Bless the Child" (Arthur Herzog, Jr., Billie Holiday) – 4:33
8. "Look to the Rainbow" (Yip Harburg, Burton Lane) – 2:36
9. "Turn Around" (Harry Belafonte, Alan Greene, Malvina Reynolds) – 3:13
10. "Hello, Young Lovers" (Oscar Hammerstein II, Richard Rodgers) – 2:13
11. "Wrap Your Troubles in Dreams (and Dream Your Troubles Away)" (Harry Barris, Ted Koehler, Billy Moll) – 3:19
12. "And I'll Be There" (A. Bergman, Marilyn Bergman, Dave Grusin) – 3:56
13. "Pick Yourself Up" (Dorothy Fields, Jerome Kern) – 2:51
14. "Look for the Silver Lining" (Buddy DeSylva, Kern) – 2:54
15. "Funny Face" (George Gershwin, Ira Gershwin) – 2:51
16. "A Child Is Only a Moment" (Earl Brown) – 3:39
17. "Sisters" (Berlin) – 2:44
