= Girl Singer =

Studio album by Rosemary Clooney
- Released: 1992
- Recorded: 1992
- Length: 51:10
- Label: Concord
- Producer: John Burk

Rosemary Clooney chronology
For the Duration (1991)	Girl Singer (1992)	Do You Miss New York? (1993)

Professional ratings
Review scores
Source	Rating
Allmusic	2.5/5 stars

Girl Singer is a 1992 studio album by Rosemary Clooney. Clooney sings with a big band on the album, which is the first of her Concord Records series not to feature Scott Hamilton.

The introduction to "Straighten Up and Fly Right" is from the Clooney Sisters' March 1945 audition tape.

== Track listing ==
1. "Nice 'n' Easy" (Alan Bergman, Lew Spence, Marilyn Keith) – 3:13
2. "Sweet Kentucky Ham" (Dave Frishberg) – 3:55
3. "Autumn in New York" (Vernon Duke) – 4:50
4. "Miss Otis Regrets" (Cole Porter) – 3:20
5. "Let There Be Love" (Lionel Rand, Ian Grant) – 3:46
6. "Lovers After All" (Richard Rodney Bennett, Johnny Mandel) – 3:44
7. "From This Moment On" (Porter) – 3:13
8. "More Than You Know" (Vincent Youmans, Billy Rose, Edward Eliscu) – 3:38
9. "Wave" (Antonio Carlos Jobim) – 3:46
10. "We Fell In Love Anyway" (Mike Reid, Naomi Martin) – 3:12
11. Duke Ellington Medley: "It Don't Mean a Thing (If It Ain't Got That Swing)"/"I'm Checking Out, Goodbye" (Duke Ellington, Irving Mills)/(Ellington, Billy Strayhorn) – 2:20
12. "Of Course It's Crazy" (Mike Reid, Mack David) – 4:56
13. "Straighten Up and Fly Right" (Irving Mills, Nat King Cole) – 4:57
14. "The Best Is Yet to Come" (Cy Coleman, Carolyn Leigh) – 2:10

== Personnel ==
=== Performance ===
- Rosemary Clooney – vocal
- John Oddo – arranger, conductor
