= Lebert Lombardo =

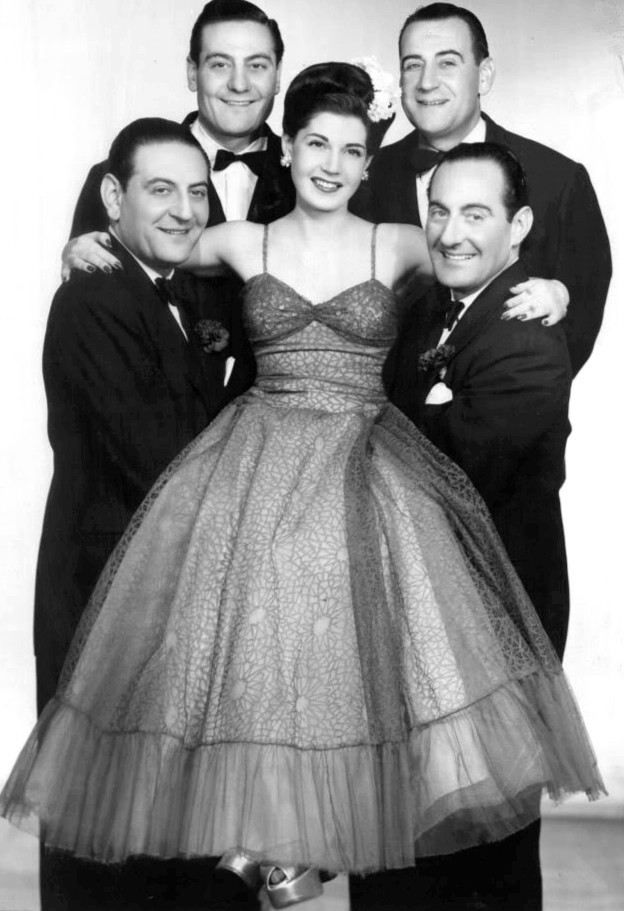
- Lebert Lombardo at top right with brothers Guy, Victor, and Carmen, and sister Rose Marie

Background information
- Birth name: Lebert Joseph Lombardo
- Born: February 11, 1905; London, Canada
- Died: June 16, 1993 (aged 88); Sanibel, Florida, U.S.
- Occupation: Musician
- Instrument(s): Trumpet, vocals

Lebert Lombardo (February 11, 1905 – June 16, 1993) was a musician with the Royal Canadians and a younger brother of Guy Lombardo.

== Biography ==
Lombardo was born in London, Ontario, Canada. He had three brothers who also became musicians: Guy, Carmen, and Victor.

With his brother Carmen, Lebert Lombardo was a member of the original Royal Canadians, playing trumpet, cornet, and drums.

On June 14, 1937, Lombardo married Helen Healey in New York City. Earlier, he had been married to Carol Williams,

She and Lombardo had been victims of a theft in 1930.
