= Victor Lombardo =

Canadian musician (1911–1994)

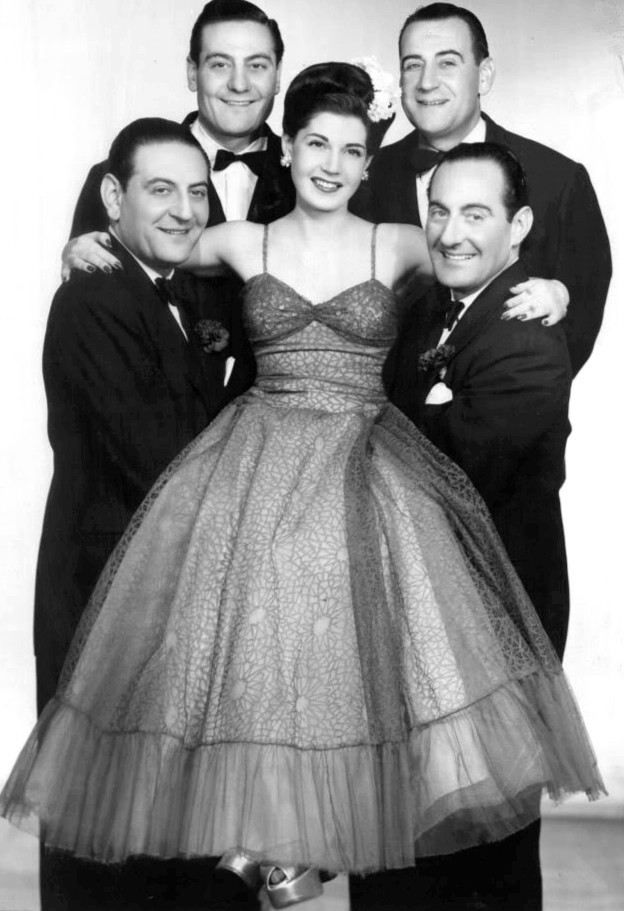
- Victor Lombardo at top left with brothers Guy, Lebert and Carmen and sister Rose Marie.
- Born: Victor Lombardo; April 10, 1911
- Died: January 22, 1994 (aged 82)
- Occupation: Musician
- Spouse(s): Virginia Dabe (1931 - ?); Kathryn Baggott (? - 1994, his death)
- Children: 2

Victor Lombardo (April 10, 1911 – January 22, 1994) was a musician and member of his brother Guy Lombardo's band, the Royal Canadians.

== Early life and career ==
Lombardo was born in London, Ontario, Canada. Gaetano and Angelina Lombardo had seven children. His father was a tailor.

Along with his brothers Guy, Carmen, and Lebert, Victor Lombardo was a member of the original Royal Canadians, playing saxophone with the band.

In the late 1940s, Lombardo had his own 20-piece orchestra that featured "the smooth Lombardo family style of music that has won the applause of appreciative audiences throughout the entire nation." The group had its own radio program on the Mutual Broadcasting System.

Later, he rejoined the band and ultimately replaced older brother Guy as bandleader after Guy's 1977 death. That tenure was short, however, as he and the Royal Canadians parted ways early in 1978. His brother, Lebert, attributed the separation to Victor's desire to make changes in the orchestra's personnel and its sound.

== Personal life and death ==
On November 10, 1931, Lombardo married Virginia Dabe, in Manhattan, New York. His second wife was the former Kathryn Baggott.

Lombardo died January 22, 1994, in Boca Raton Community Hospital. He was 82.
