= Carmen Lombardo =

Canadian-American saxophonist and vocalist

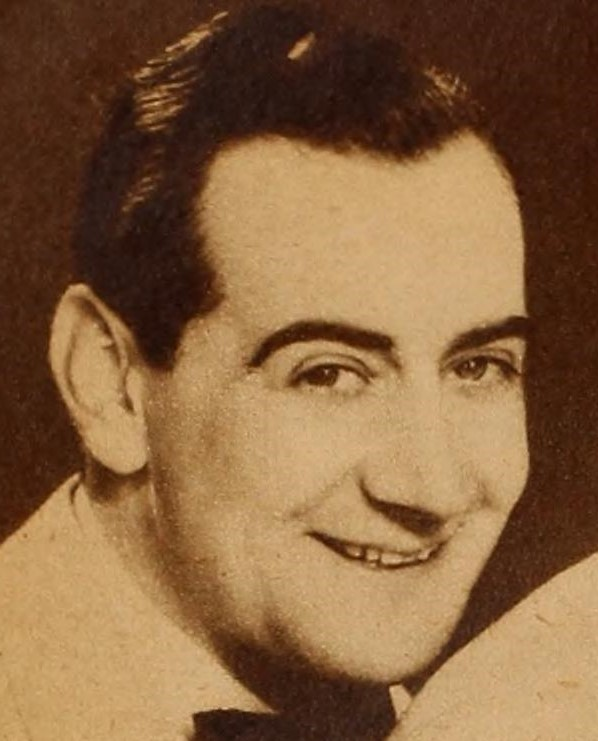
- Lombardo in 1935
- Born: July 16, 1903; London, Ontario, Canada
- Died: April 17, 1971 (aged 67); Miami, Florida, U.S.
- Occupation: Musician

Carmen Lombardo (July 16, 1903 – April 17, 1971) was lead saxophonist and featured vocalist for his brother Guy Lombardo's orchestra. He was also a successful composer. In 1927, Carmen Lombardo was the vocalist of the hit record Charmaine, performed by Guy Lombardo and His Royal Canadians.

== Early years ==
Lombardo was born in London, Ontario, Canada. As a child, he took flute lessons, and later learned to play saxophone.

He had three brothers who also became musicians: Guy, Lebert, and Victor.

== Career ==
As a young man played in the Lombardo Brothers Concert Company with Guy on violin and another brother, Lebert, on trumpet or piano. As the band grew, Guy became conductor, and the band developed into The Royal Canadians in 1923, in which Carmen both sang and wrote music.

He frequently collaborated with American composers and his music was recorded by Louis Armstrong, Bing Crosby, and others. Many of his compositions have also been used in Woody Allen films. When singing songs like "Alone at a Table for Two" he would allow his voice to tremble, and seem nearly to break into tears-he was caricatured in Warner Brothers cartoons as "Cryman" Lombardo.

In the late 1960s, actor-raconteur Tony Randall made several TV appearances on The Tonight Show Starring Johnny Carson in which he sang songs written by Carmen Lombardo in a voice imitating (and somewhat exaggerating) Lombardo's style. On one appearance, Lombardo and Randall performed a duet of Lombardo's "Boo Hoo (You've Got Me Crying for You)", which was one of the songs that Randall typically included in his Lombardo routine.

== Death ==
Lombardo died of cancer in Miami in 1971, aged 67.

== Compositions by Carmen Lombardo ==
Lombardo's popular compositions included:

- The 1928 classic "Sweethearts on Parade", which was number one for three weeks in 1929 on the U.S. pop charts of the day.
- "A Lane in Spain", a popular recording by Jean Goldkette and His Orchestra in 1927.
- "Ridin' Around in the Rain", written with Gene Austin in 1934. Popular versions were by Austin, Bing Crosby and Earl Burtnett.
- "Coquette",

External audio
- Hear Carmen Lombardo's: "Boo-Hoo" "A Sailboat in the Moonlight" played by Guy Lombardo & Carmen Lombardo in 1950; Here on Archive.org'

- "Boo Hoo (You've Got Me Crying For You)", a major hit for the Guy Lombardo orchestra.
- "A Sailboat in the Moonlight" (1937) with John Jacob Loeb,
- "Seems Like Old Times",
- "Get Out Those Old Records",
- "Return to Me" (1957) with Danny Di Minno.
- "You're Beautiful To-Night, My Dear".
- "Powder Your Face with Sunshine (Smile, Smile, Smile)", written with Stanley Rochinski in 1948–49.

Lombardo and John Jacob Loeb's 1942 song "There Won't Be a Shortage of Love" was the first song written in response to American government rationing in World War II.

He wrote five songs for the 1934 film Many Happy Returns, in which the orchestra appeared.

Lombardo wrote the words and music with John Jacob Loeb for Guy Lombardo's stage productions of Arabian Nights (1954, 1955), Paradise Island (1961, 1962), and Mardi Gras (1965, 1966) at Jones Beach Marine Theater, New York.
