= It's a Lovely Day Today =

1950 song by Irving Berlin

"It's a Lovely Day Today" is a popular song written by Irving Berlin for his successful musical Call Me Madam (1950) when it was introduced by Russell Nype and Galina Talva. The musical was adapted as a movie in 1953 and the song "It's a Lovely Day Today" was performed by Donald O'Connor and Vera-Ellen (dubbed by Carol Richards).

== Notable recordings ==
- Dick Haymes and Eileen Wilson – from Decca original cast recording.
- Russell Nype and Galina Talva – from RCA Victor original cast recording.
- Doris Day – her single release on Columbia 39055 charted briefly in January 1951.
- A recording by Perry Como and The Fontaine Sisters with Mitchell Ayres and his orchestra was made in New York City on July 26, 1950. It was released by RCA Victor Records as catalog number 20-3945 (in USA) and by EMI on the His Master's Voice label as catalog number B 10221.
- Alberto Semprini, on piano with rhythm accompaniment, recorded it in London on January 25, 1952, as the third song of the medley "Part 2. Hit Medley of Foxtrots from 'Call Me Madam'" along with "You're Just in Love" and "The Best Thing for You". The medley was released by EMI on the His Master's Voice label as catalog number B 10231.
- Ella Fitzgerald – on the album Ella Fitzgerald Sings the Irving Berlin Song Book (1958).
- Astrud Gilberto – for her album A Certain Smile, a Certain Sadness (1967)
- Rosemary Clooney – included in her album Rosemary Clooney Sings the Music of Irving Berlin (1984)
