= Call Me Madam =

1950 musical by Irving Berlin

- Original Broadway Playbill
- Music: Irving Berlin
- Lyrics: Irving Berlin
- Book: Howard Lindsay; Russel Crouse
- Productions: 1950 Broadway; 1952 West End; 1953 Australia
- Awards: Tony Award for Best Original Score

Call Me Madam is a Broadway musical written by Howard Lindsay and Russel Crouse, with music and lyrics by Irving Berlin.

The musical is a satire on politics and foreign policy that spoofs postwar America's penchant for lending billions of dollars to needy countries. It centers on Sally Adams, a well-meaning but ill-informed socialite widow who is appointed ambassador to the fictional European country of Lichtenburg, where she charms the local gentry, especially Cosmo Constantine, while her press attaché Kenneth Gibson falls in love with Princess Maria.

== Background ==
The lead character is based on Washington, D.C. hostess and Democratic Party fundraiser Perle Mesta, who was appointed ambassador to Luxembourg in 1949. The Playbill distributed at each performance humorously noted that "neither the character of Mrs. Sally Adams nor Miss Ethel Merman resemble any person living or dead."

In 1949, Merman and her family were vacationing at the Hotel Colorado in Glenwood Springs with Howard Lindsay and his wife, Dorothy Stickney. Watching Merman at poolside, while he was reading a magazine article about Mesta, Lindsay was struck by how typically "American" Merman was, and immediately envisioned her portraying a colorful character similar to the newly-appointed ambassador. When he proposed the idea to Merman, who had little interest in either society or political news, she responded, "Who's Perle Mesta?"

Although Merman had announced she was interested in playing a dramatic role in her next project, Lindsay and Russel Crouse approached Irving Berlin and began working on the book for Call Me Madam when Berlin expressed interest in composing the score. Berlin's last production, Miss Liberty, had failed to recoup its investment, and he was determined to repeat the success he had had with Annie Get Your Gun. The three collaborators agreed they needed to treat their subject with care, to avoid any legal action by Mesta. As the work progressed, Merman conceded she would be willing to sing two or three songs, but eventually accepted the fact she was going to star in a full-scale musical comedy, instead of the drama she preferred.

Producer Leland Hayward budgeted the production at $250,000. In exchange for the original cast recording and television broadcast rights, he arranged to have it financed 100% by RCA Records and NBC, with the two sharing 35% of the net earnings. In order to increase the profits, Hayward decided to charge an all-time high of $7.20 for orchestra seats.

Hayward hired George Abbott to direct, and Abbott and casting director Harold Prince auditioned thousands of actors for the twenty speaking roles and twenty-nine chorus members. Raoul Pene du Bois was hired to design sets and costumes, while the wardrobe worn by Merman was the responsibility of Mainbocher.

Once the script was completed, everyone agreed that, while it seemed originally little more than standard situation-comedy material—although as the years have transpired, many musical aficionados rate it much higher—it was a perfect vehicle for Merman, and that Berlin's score, raised to its pinnacle by Merman, was tuneful and memorable. Berlin wrote "Something to Dance About" to give the second act a lively opening. When the star requested a duet with Russell Nype playing her lovestruck press attaché, Berlin responded by writing the counterpoint tune "You're Just in Love" and it ultimately became a showstopper at every performance.

== Synopsis ==
Sally Adams, a wealthy widow from Oklahoma, lives in Washington, D.C., where she is known as "the hostess with the mostest," famed for throwing the best parties in town. Despite her complete lack of experience, she is tapped as ambassador to the tiniest country in Europe, the Grand Duchy of Lichtenburg. The young press attaché Kenneth Gibson accompanies her as her aide. Sally is disappointed to find that Lichtenburg's foreign minister, Cosmo Constantine, is a formal and standoffish person who refuses to accept America's offer of foreign aid. She hatches a plot to get Cosmo promoted to the office of prime minister, thinking that he can be replaced by a foreign minister more open to her American manners and way of thinking. Meanwhile, Kenneth meets Princess Maria, daughter of the duke and duchess. Her parents are planning to marry her to a wealthy suitor whose fortune will help the duchy financially. Despite the fact that she is forbidden to speak to commoners, the princess and Kenneth fall in love.

Cosmo learns of Sally's plans for him and resigns his position, opening the way for the country's first general election in twenty years. Sally openly campaigns for Cosmo to become prime minister, and is recalled to Washington for interfering in another country's internal affairs. However, the spirit of democracy has awakened in Lichtenburg: Cosmo is elected prime minister and the duke and duchess grant permission for Maria and Kenneth to marry.

== Productions ==
Directed by George Abbott and choreographed by Jerome Robbins, the musical premiered at the Shubert Theatre in New Haven, Connecticut on September 11, 1950. Reviews were mixed—Variety said it "inspires warm applause rather than cheer"—and Berlin wrote two new songs to bolster the sagging second act. It opened in Boston on September 19, and while The Boston Record thought it offered "only an occasional flash of inspirational fire", it played to standing-room-only audiences throughout the run.

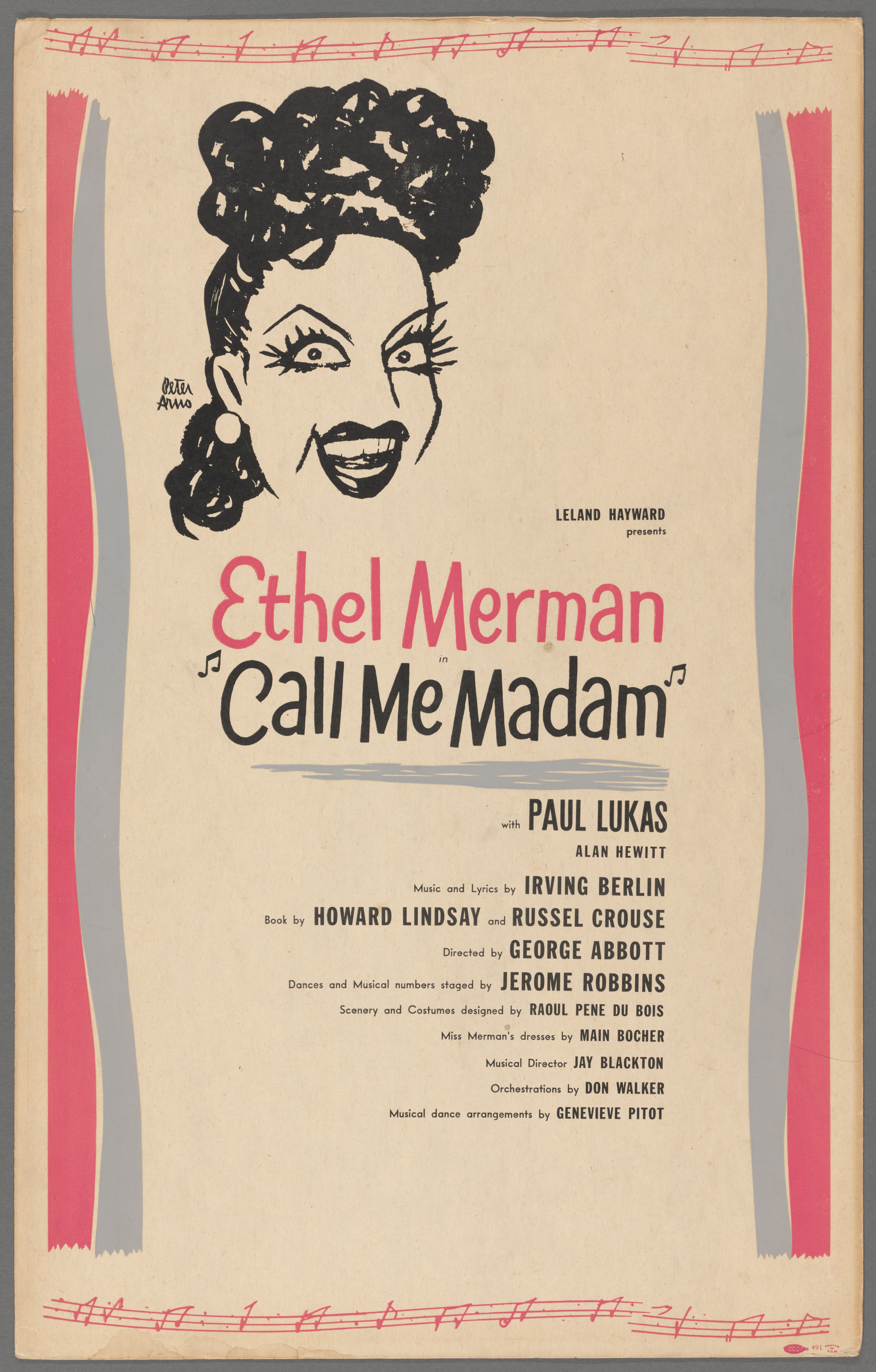
Poster for the stage production Call Me Madam at the Imperial Theatre

With a record advance sale of $2 million, the Broadway production opened on October 12 at the Imperial Theatre, where it ran for 644 performances and grossed more than $4 million. In addition to Merman and Nype, the cast included Paul Lukas, Pat Harrington, Sr., Galina Talva, Lilia Skala, Tommy Rall and Richard Eastham. Brooks Atkinson of The New York Times thought it offered one of Berlin's "most enchanting scores: fresh, light, and beguiling, and fitted to lyrics that fall out of it with grace and humor", and the New York Post called Merman "indescribably soul-satisfying", "a comedienne of rare skill", and "one of the joys of the world." She remained with the show for the entire run and appeared in the limited four-week engagement staged to celebrate the reopening of the National Theatre in Washington, D.C.

Apart from playing Rose in the first national tour of Gypsy, the role of Sally Adams in Call Me Madam was the only stage role that Merman reprised after originating on Broadway. In July 1965, Merman headlined a revival by the Valley Music Theater in which Richard Eastham and Russell Nype also reprised their Broadway roles. The production played an encore engagement, without Nype, in Houston that October. Merman, Eastham and Nype again reprised their Broadway roles for a 1967 summer stock tour of Call Me Madam.

The national tour of Call Me Madam was headlined by Elaine Stritch. Merman's understudy during the show's Broadway run, Stritch had never performed as Sally Adams at the Imperial, her debut in the role occurring at a matinee performance during the show's May 1952 Washington D.C. engagement. Subsequent to engagements at the Nixon Theater in Pittsburgh and the Hanna Theatre in Cleveland, with respective openings on June 2 and 9, 1952, the national tour opened at the Philharmonic Auditorium on June 23, 1952, with further engagements in nine other cities, including Chicago and Detroit, the finale an engagement at the Iroquois Park Amphitheater in Louisville in August 1953. Throughout most of the tour, Stritch's leading man was Kent Smith as Cosmo Constantine, although Dick Smart took the role before the tour's end. The cast of the national tour also included Pat Harrington Sr. and Jay Velie reprising their Broadway roles. Stritch reprised the role of Sally Adams in two regional theatrical productions, headlining at the St. Louis Municipal Opera Theatre in 1954, with Nype reprising his Broadway role, and for the Valley Forge Music Fair in 1956.

Call Me Madam returned to the New York stage for the first time since its original Broadway run via the New York City Center Encores! semi-staged concert version, with Tyne Daly headlining a cast including Walter Charles as Cosmo Constantine, Lewis Cleale as Kenneth and Melissa Errico as Princess Maria. Presented in February 1995 as the inaugural production of the Encores! second season, Call Me Madam was lauded as the company's first hit production. Encores! presented a fully-staged production in February 2019, with Carmen Cusack headlining a cast that included Darrell Hammond as Grand Duke Otto, Carol Kane as Grand Duchess Sophie, Stanley Wayne Mathis as Senator Borckbank, Randy Rainbow as Sebastian Sebastian and Lauren Worsham as Princess Maria.

Call Me Madam had its premiere regional theatrical engagement at the Dallas State Fair in August 1952, with Joan Blondell headlining and Russell Nype reprising his Broadway role. The cast also included William LeMassena as Pemberton Maxwell, Michael Pollock as Sebastian Sebastian and Gene Raymond as Cosmo Constantine. In 1959, Constance Bennett headlined a production featuring Wilbur Evans as Cosmo Constantine that played engagements at the Camden County Music Fair and the Storrowtown Music Fair. Also in 1959, Penny Singleton headlined a production by the St. Louis Municipal Opera Theatre in which both Russell Nype and Pat Harrington Sr. reprised their Broadway roles. Wilbur Evans reprised the role of Cosmo Constantine in a 1963 production headlined by Martha Raye that played engagements at the Valley Forge Music Fair and at the Storrowtown Music Fair, with Kenneth Gibson played by James Kirkwood. Margaret Whiting, who headlined a 1961 production that played in Boston and New Jersey, in 1966 headlined the play's Melody Top summer stock production in Milwaukee that featured Tommy Sands as Kenneth Gibson.

Jo Anne Worley, who headlined the 1987 Pasadena Convention Center production of Call Me Madam, also headlined a semi-staged concert version mounted in 2001 at the Auditorium Theatre (Chicago) with Malcolm Gets as Kenneth Gibson and Fred Willard. Leslie Uggams headlined a revival mounted at the Paper Mill Playhouse in Millburn, New Jersey in April–May 1996. The additional cast included J. B. Adams as Henry Gibson/Grand Duke Otto, Mark Baker as Pemberton Maxwell and Vanessa Dorman as Princess Maria. In September 2000, Call Me Madam was mounted at the UCLA Freud Playhouse with Karen Morrow headlining a cast that included Robert Mandan as Pemberton Maxwell, Michael Nouri as Cosmo Constantine, Hugh Panaro as Kenneth Gibson and Michael Tucci as Congressman Wilkins.

Other regional productions of Call Me Madam have been headlined by Maxene Andrews (East Windsor, Connecticut, 1976), Klea Blackhurst (San Francisco, 2009), Kim Criswell with Catherine Brunell as Princess Maria and David Hess as Cosmo Constantine (Middlesex County, Connecticut, 2004), Ruta Lee (Fort Worth, Texas, 1978) and Helen Reddy with Monte Markham as Cosmo Constantine (Sacramento, California, 1986).

Call Me Madam opened in the West End at the London Coliseum on March 15, 1952 for a run of 486 performances. Billie Worth headlined a cast that included Anton Walbrook as Cosmo Constantine and Shani Wallis—in her first major stage role—as Princess Maria. Noele Gordon—who had understudied Worth during the London Coliseum run—headlined the production's British touring edition in 1953. A 78-rpm cast recording of the production was released on the Columbia Records label in 1952, with Billie Worth and Arthur Lowe, titled Vocal Gems from Call Me Madam.

In 1983, Gordon headlined a West End revival with a cast that also included Jeremy Hawk as Pemberton Maxwell and Basil Hoskins as Cosmo Constantine. The production opened on March 14, 1983 and ran for seven weeks at the Victoria Palace.

Call Me Madam has since had two London fringe productions, the first at Upstairs at The Gatehouse in the summer of 2009 with Thom Southerland directing a cast including Beverley Klein as Sally Adams, Chris Love as Kenneth Gibson, Kate Nelson as Princess Maria and Gido Schimanski as Cosmo Constantine. The Union Theatre, London mounted Call Me Madam in the fall of 2012, staged and directed by Michael Strassen and headlined by Lucy Williamson with a cast including Gavin Kerr, Leo Miles and Natalie Lipin. The play was nominated for five Offies and was named as one of the productions when the Union won Best Fringe at The Stage Awards in 2013 alongside The Globe (Best Theatre).

Call Me Madam began its inaugural Australian engagement on September 5, 1953 at Her Majesty's Theatre, Melbourne with Evie Hayes headlining a cast that also included David Cahill as Hugo Tantinnin and Alec Kellaway as Congressman Wilkins. The production also played engagements in Brisbane and Sydney. Revived in 1985 at the Canberra Theatre with June Bronhill headlining and David Branson featured as Cosmo Constantine, Call Me Madam was mounted in 2000 at the Arts Centre Melbourne with Geraldine Turner headlining a cast that included Rachael Beck as Princess Maria, Reg Gorman as Congressman Wilkins and Spencer McLaren as Kenneth Gibson.

== Film adaptation ==
A 1953 Twentieth Century-Fox film adaptation stars Ethel Merman, George Sanders, Donald O'Connor, Billy DeWolfe, Charles Dingle and Vera-Ellen.

== Casts (1950s-1970s) ==
Character	Original Broadway Production	Original West End Production	US National Tour	State Fair Musicals Production	Film Version	Pittsburgh Civic Light Opera Production	Lambertville Music Circus Production	The MUNY Production	The MUNY Production	Music Fair Circuit Production	Ben Kapen’s Melodyland Production	Kenley Players Production	The MUNY Production
Character	1950-1952	1952-1953		1952	1953			1954	1959		1966	1968	
Mrs. Sally Adams	Ethel Merman	Billie Worth	Ethel Merman	Joan Blondell	Ethel Merman	Elaine Stritch	Eleanor Lutton	Elaine Stritch	Penny Singleton	Constance Bennett	Pearl Bailey	Ethel Merman	Ethel Merman
Cosmo Constantine	Paul Lukas	Anton Walbrook	Richard Eastham	Gene Raymond	George Sanders	Richard Smart	?	Kent Smith	Mitchell Gregg	Wilbur Evans	?	Richard Eastham	Richard Eastham
Kenneth Gibson	Russell Nype	Jeff Warren	Russell Nype	Russell Nype	Donald O'Connor	David Daniels	?	Russell Nype	Russell Nype	Ron Beattie	William Falkner	Russell Nype	Russell Nype
Princess Maria	Galina Talva	Shani Wallis	Galina Talva	Ellen McCown	Vera-Ellen Carol Richards (Singing Voice)	Arlyne Frank	?	Dorothy Coulter	Peggy Alderman	Helen Strine	?	Donna McKechnie	Donna McKechnie
Congressman Wilkins	Pat Harrington Sr.	Sidney Keith	Pat Harrington Sr.	Joe E. Marks	Percy Helton	Pat Harrington Sr.	?	Dick Bernie	Pat Harrington Sr.	Steen Rodnum	?	Ted Chapman	C.M. Gampel
Pemberton Maxwell	Alan Hewitt	Donald Burr	Alexander Clark	William LeMassena	Billy De Wolfe	Lee Bergere	?	Alexander Clark	Edmund Lyndeck	Alex Alexander	?	Arthur Bartow	Arthur Bartow
Henry Gibson	William David	David Storm	William David	Oran Osburn	—N/a	Le Roi Operti	?	Vincent Vernon	Eustace Fletcher	?	?	William Boehm	Charles Collins
Senator Gallagher	Ralph Chambers	Launce Maraschel	Ralph Chambers	Frank Rogier	Emory Parnell	William Putch	?	Norbert Winkler	Joseph Cusanelli	Richard Kuss	?	Tom Batten	William Griffis
Senator Brockbank	Jay Velie	Arthur Lowe	Jay Velie	Owen Hewitt	Charles Dingle	Jay Velie	?	Harry O. Weber	Walter Richardson	Martin Cohen	?	Ed Van Nuys	Ed Van Nuys
Sebastian Sebastian	Henry Lascoe	Stanley Van Beers	Cliff Dunstan	Michael Pollock	Steven Geray	Robert Bernard	?	Robert Eckles	Emile Renan	Mitchell Jason	?	Richard Graham	Richard Graham
Grand Duke Otto	Owen Coll	Felix Kent	Owen Coll	Robert Glenn	Ludwig Stössel	?	?	Ed Herchert	Larry Brown	S. A. Russo	?	Angus Cairns	Truman Gaige
Grand Duchess Sophie	Lilia Skala	Marianne Deeming	Frances Clark	Hildegarde Tomanek	Lilia Skala	Florence Dunlap	?	Florence Dunlap	Dorothy Blackburn	Judith LaBrecque	?	Thalia Mazarakes	Eleanor Phelps
Hugo Tantinnin	E. A. Krumschmidt	Ernst Ulman	E. A. Krumschmidt	David Morris	Helmut Dantine	Victor Clarke	?	Robert Bernard	Robert Eckles	Lou Fryman	?	Zale Kessler	Zale Kessler
The Secretary of State	Geoffrey Lumb	Robert Henderson	Geoffrey Lumb	Donald Somers	Walter Woolf King	Jerry Goff	?	Jack Davis	Richard Fredricks	Robert Gregori	?	Lawrence Vincent	Bill Pollard

=== Notable replacements ===
==== Original Broadway production (1950–1952) ====
- Mrs. Sally Adams: Dinah Shore, Nancy Andrews (s/b), Elaine Stritch (s/b)
- Cosmo Constantine: Richard Eastham
- Princess Maria: Jeanne Bal (u/s)

==== U.S. national tour (1952–1953) ====
- Mrs. Sally Adams: Elaine Stritch
- Cosmo Constantine: Kent Smith

== Casts (1980s-2020s) ==
Character	Birmingham Repertory Theatre Production	West End Revival	Broadway Sacramento Production	California Music Theatre Production	BBC Radio Production	Encores! Production	Paper Mill Playhouse Production	Reprise Theatre Company Production	BBC Radio Production	Goodspeed Musicals Production	Lyric Theater of Oklahoma Production	Encores! Production
Character	1982	1983	1986	1987	1994	1995	1996	2000	2003	2004	2012	2019
Mrs. Sally Adams	Noele Gordon	Noele Gordon	Helen Reddy	Jo Anne Worley	Tyne Daly	Tyne Daly	Leslie Uggams	Karen Morrow	Kim Criswell	Kim Criswell	Beth Leavel	Carmen Cusack
Cosmo Constantine	?	Basil Hoskins	Monte Markham	Giorgio Tozzi	David Kernan	Walter Charles	Neal Benari	Michael Nouri	Simon Green	David Hess	Steve Blanchard	Ben Davis
Kenneth Gibson	?	William Relton	Bill Hutton	Michael Magnusen	John Barrowman	Lewis Cleale	Jonathan Hadley	Hugh Panaro	Julian Ovenden	Zachary Halley	Jeremy Benton	Jason Gotay
Princess Maria	?	Veronica Page	Lauri Landry	Beverly Ward	Shona Lindsay	Melissa Errico	Vanessa Dorman	Melissa Dye	Anna-Jane Casey	Catherine Brunell	Molly Rushing	Lauren Worsham
Congressman Wilkins	?	Bernard Martin	?	Howard Chitjian	Don Fellows	Christopher Durang	MichaelJohn McGann	Michael Tucci	?	David Monzione	Adam Heller	Adam Heller
Pemberton Maxwell	?	Jeremy Hawk	Ray Stewart	Ray Stewart	Bob Sessions	Peter Bartlett	Mark Baker	Robert Mandan	Mark Fredrick	Stephen Temperley	Eric McNaughton	Michael Benjamin Washington
Henry Gibson	?	Michael Harding	?	Joe Galletta	Kim Grant	John Leslie Wolfe	J. B. Adams	Jeff Austin	?	Scott Willis	Robert Matson	Christopher Gurr
Senator Gallagher	?	John Aron	?	Cooper Neal	David Healy	Ken Page	Michael James Leslie	Gerry McIntyre	?	William Ryall	Brian Stockton	Brad Oscar
Senator Brockbank	?	David Alder	?	George Huttenbrauck	Dan Russell	MacIntyre Dixon	Hal Robinson	Paul Clausen	?	Branch Woodman	Tom Huston Orr	Stanley Wayne Mathis
Sebastian Sebastian	?	Stefan Paul Sanchez	?	Michael Demaree	?	Simon Jones	Jay Stuart	Paul Keith	?	Jay Bodin	Vince Leseney	Randy Rainbow
Grand Duke Otto	?	Michael Harding	?	Joe Galletta	Kim Grant	Gordon Connell	J. B. Adams	Jeff Austin	?	Kevin Covert	Robert Matson	Darrell Hammond
Grand Duchess Sophie	?	Moyna Cope	?	?	Pamela Cundell	Jane Connell	Nancy Johnston	Jennifer Butt	?	Nicole Debace	Marilyn Govich	Carol Kane
Hugo Tantinnin	?	Jonathan Owen	Zale Kessler	Zale Kessler	Freddy Lees	?	Mark Manley	?	?	Jerold Goldstein	Charlie Monnot	?
The Secretary of State	?	Colin Thomas	?	Marc Cherry	?	?	?	?	?	?	?	?

== Musical numbers ==
Act I

- "Mrs. Sally Adams" – Company
- "The Hostess With the Mostes' on the Ball" – Sally
- "Washington Square Dance" – Sally and Company
- "Lichtenburg" – Cosmo and Singers
- "Can You Use Any Money Today?" – Sally
- "Marrying For Love" – Cosmo and Sally
- "The Ocarina" – Princess Maria and Company
- "It's a Lovely Day Today" – Kenneth and Princess Maria
- "The Best Thing for You (Would Be Me)" – Sally and Cosmo

Act II

- "Lichtenburg" (Reprise) – Cosmo and Singers
- "Something To Dance About" – Sally and Company
- "Once Upon a Time Today" – Kenneth
- "They Like Ike" – Congressman Wilkins, Senator Gallagher and Senator Brockbank
- "You're Just in Love" – Sally and Kenneth
- "The Best Thing for You (Would Be Me)" (Reprise) – Sally and Cosmo
- "It's a Lovely Day Today" (Reprise) – Kenneth and Princess Maria
- "Mrs. Sally Adams" (Reprise) – Company
- "Finale" – Sally and Company

== Recordings ==
Two LP albums of the score were released. The recording rights had been granted to RCA Victor, which had invested in the show, but Merman was under contract to Decca Records, which refused to allow her to record the original cast album. Decca issued a 10-inch LP featuring Merman singing some of her songs, accompanied by arranger-conductor Gordon Jenkins and His Orchestra and Chorus, with vocalizing by Dick Haymes (who joined Merman in the show's biggest hit, "You're Just in Love", their single reaching Billboard magazine's number 30 for a week) and Eileen Wilson (who sang "It's a Lovely Day Today" with Haymes). RCA Victor issued the original cast album, replacing Merman with Dinah Shore.

Merman was recalled to the Decca studios to record additional songs from the show, and the label rereleased the album as a 12-inch LP under the title Ethel Merman: 12 Songs from Call Me Madam. The Victor album sold reasonably well, attaining the sixth spot on the Billboard popular album charts, but the LP was out of print from 1956 until RCA Red Seal reissued it briefly in 1977. Peaking at number two on Billboard's popular album charts, Merman's Decca recording, which appeared on MCA Records beginning in 1973, stayed steadily in print until the end of the LP era. Merman's Madam album was most recently available on a Decca Broadway CD, which also features Merman singing four Cole Porter tunes from the stage score of Panama Hattie (1940).

A recording of the 1952 London West End production was released with 12 numbers from the show, with Billie Worth, Anton Walbrook, Jeff Warren and Shani Wallis in the principal roles, conducted by Cyril Ornadel. The release was later reissued on the Sepia label.

Merman also is heard on the film soundtrack album (with Donald O'Connor and George Sanders), issued in 1953 as a 10-inch album, also on the Decca label. Scoring fifth position on Billboard's popular albums charts when first released, the soundtrack, taken out of print in 1957, was reissued in 1981 by Stet Records on a 12-inch LP that also contained songs from the film scores of Guys and Dolls (1955) and I'll Cry Tomorrow (1955). The Merman soundtrack has not been issued on CD.

A 1995 Broadway concert cast album featuring Tyne Daly, Lewis Cleale, Christopher Durang, Ken Page and Melissa Errico is available on the DRG label.

== Promotional appearances ==
On the premiere episode of NBC Radio's The Big Show on November 5, 1950, original Broadway cast members Ethel Merman, Paul Lukas and Russell Nype performed songs from the score in the order of their appearance in the production, while host Tallulah Bankhead added story notes between songs. Merman sang "The Hostess with the Mostes' on the Ball", then Lukas sang "Lichtenburg", then Merman sang "Can You Use Any Money Today?" and "The Best Thing for You (Would Be Me)". Merman also sang "You're Just in Love" with Nype.

== In political culture ==
When Englishwoman Betty Boothroyd was assigned the chair of deputy speaker (1987–1992), backbencher Peter Pike asked her: "What do we call you?" Drawing from her showbusiness years, Boothroyd replied: "Call me Madam."

== Awards ==
Year	Award	Category	Nominee	Result
1951	Tony Awards	Outstanding Musical Score	Irving Berlin	Won
1951	Tony Awards	Best Performance by a Leading Actress in a Musical	Ethel Merman	Won
1951	Tony Awards	Best Performance by a Featured Actor in a Musical	Russell Nype	Won
1951	Tony Awards	Best Stage Technician	Peter Feller	Won
1951	Theatre World Award		Russell Nype	Won
