= Ethel Merman discography =

The following is a discography of American singer and actress Ethel Merman.

== Albums ==
- Ethel Merman in Song Hits from "Stars in Your Eyes" (Liberty Music Shop, 1939) – 2 records (L-255/6)
- Panama Hattie (1940) – 2 records
- Annie Get Your Gun (Decca, 1946)
  Ethel Merman with Ray Middleton and members of the original cast
- Songs She Made Famous (Decca, 1949)
- Songs from "Call Me Madam" (Decca, 1950)
- 12 Songs from "Call Me Madam" (Decca, 1950)
- Call Me Madam (Decca, 1953)
  Ethel Merman, Donald O'Connor, George Sanders
- The Actual Recording of the Duet from The Ford 50th Anniversary Television Show (Decca, 1953)
  Ethel Merman and Mary Martin
- There's No Business like Show Business (Decca, 1954)
  Ethel Merman, Donald O'Connor, Dan Dailey, Johnnie Ray, Mitzi Gaynor, Dolores Gray with the 20th Century-Fox Symphony Orchestra and Chorus
- Memories (Festival, 1955)
- Happy Hunting (RCA Victor, 1956)
- A Musical Autobiography (Decca, 1958)
- Gypsy – A Musical Fable (Columbia Masterworks, 1959)
  Ethel Merman, original cast
- Merman... Her Greatest! (Reprise, 1961)
- Merman in Vegas (Reprise, 1961)
- Annie Get Your Gun: Original Cast Album from the Music Theater of Lincoln Center (RCA Victor, 1966)
  Ethel Merman, also starring Bruce Yarnell, Benay Venuta and Jerry Orbach
- Merman Sings Merman (London, 1972)
- Ethel Merman Sings "Annie Get Your Gun" (Decca, 1974)
  Ethel Merman with the London Festival Orchestra and Chorus
- Ethel's Ridin' High (Decca, 1974)
- The Ethel Merman Disco Album (A&M, 1979)
- Anything Goes / Panama Hattie (Sandy Hook Records, 1981)
  Ethel Merman, Frank Sinatra
- At Carnegie Hall (Westrax, 1982)
- Something for the Boys (AEI Records, 1985)
  Ethel Merman, Paula Laurence
