= Jack Haley =

American actor (1898–1979)

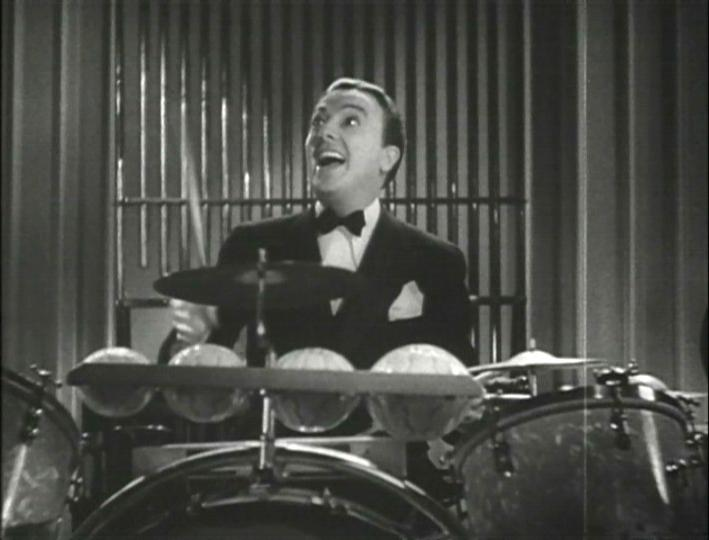
- Haley in Alexander's Ragtime Band (1938)
- Born: John Joseph Haley Jr. August 10, 1898; Boston, Massachusetts, U.S.
- Died: June 6, 1979 (aged 80); Los Angeles, California, U.S.
- Occupations: Actor; comedian; dancer; radio host; singer; drummer; vaudevillian
- Years active: 1923–1977
- Known for: The Tin Man in MGM's The Wizard of Oz (1939)
- Spouse: Florence McFadden (m. 1921)
- Children: 2, including Jack Haley Jr.

John Joseph Haley Jr. (August 10, 1898 – June 6, 1979) was an American actor, comedian, dancer, radio host, singer, drummer and vaudevillian. He is most notable for his portrayal of the Tin Man and his farmhand counterpart Hickory in the 1939 Metro-Goldwyn-Mayer film The Wizard of Oz.

== Early life ==
Haley was born in Boston, Massachusetts, on August 10, 1898 (some sources say 1897). He was raised in the Beachmont Neighborhood of Revere. His Canadian-born father John Joseph Haley Sr. was a waiter by trade, and later a ship's steward. He died in the wreck of the schooner Charles A. Briggs at Nahant, on February 1, 1898, aged 31, before Jack was born. Jack had one older brother, William Anthony "Bill" Haley, a musician, who died in 1916 from tuberculosis at the age of 21.

== Career ==
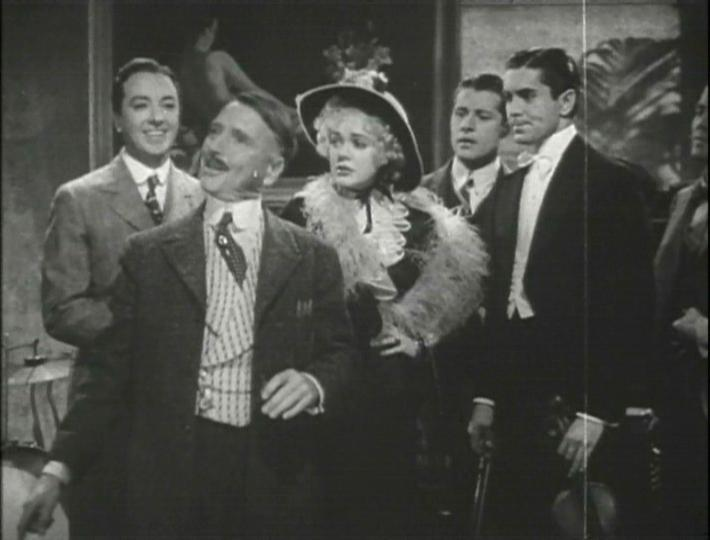
Haley (far left) in a trailer for Alexander's Ragtime Band (1938)

Haley headlined in vaudeville as a song-and-dance comedian. One of his closest friends was Fred Allen, who would frequently mention "Mr. Jacob Haley of Newton Highlands, Massachusetts" on the air. Haley made a few phonograph records in 1923, and in the early 1930s starred in comedy shorts for Vitaphone in Brooklyn, New York. His wide-eyed, good-natured expression gained him supporting roles in musical feature films, including Poor Little Rich Girl (1936) with Shirley Temple, and the Irving Berlin musical Alexander's Ragtime Band (1938). Both Poor Little Rich Girl and Alexander's Ragtime Band were released by Twentieth Century-Fox. Haley was under contract to them and appeared in the Fox films Pigskin Parade (1936), marking his first appearance with Judy Garland, and Rebecca of Sunnybrook Farm (1938). Haley hosted a radio show from 1937 to 1939 known to many as The Jack Haley Show. The first season (1937–1938), the show was sponsored by Log Cabin Syrup and was known as The Log Cabin Jamboree. The next season (1938–1939), the show was sponsored by Wonder Bread and was known as The Wonder Show. During the second season the show featured Gale Gordon and Lucille Ball as regular radio performers.

Haley returned to musical comedies in the 1940s. Most of his '40s work was for RKO Radio Pictures. He left the studio in 1947 when he refused to appear in a remake of RKO's Seven Keys to Baldpate. Phillip Terry took the role. He subsequently went into real estate, taking guest roles in television series over the next couple of decades.

=== "The Tin Man" in The Wizard of Oz ===
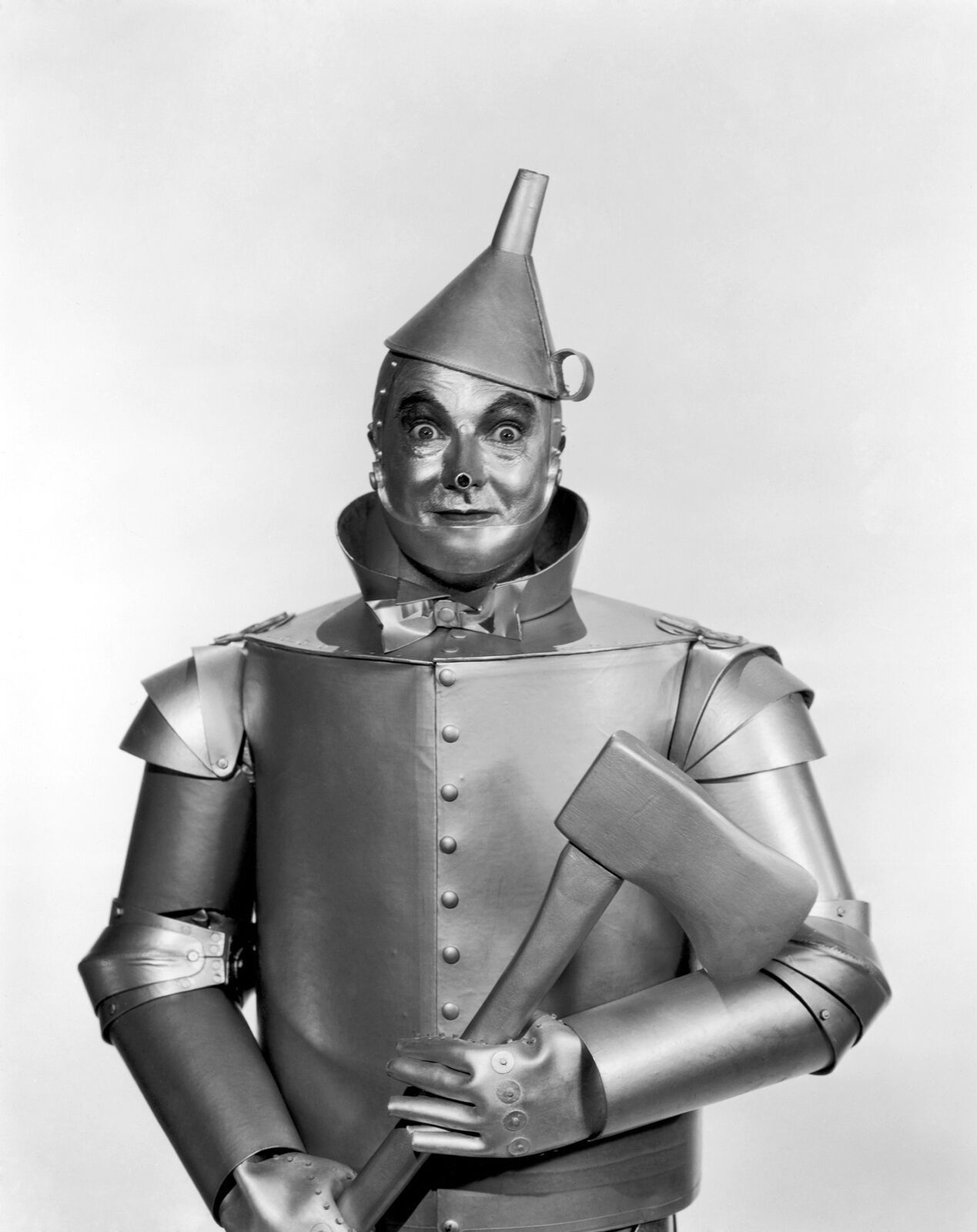
Haley as the Tin Man in the MGM feature film The Wizard of Oz, 1939 film.

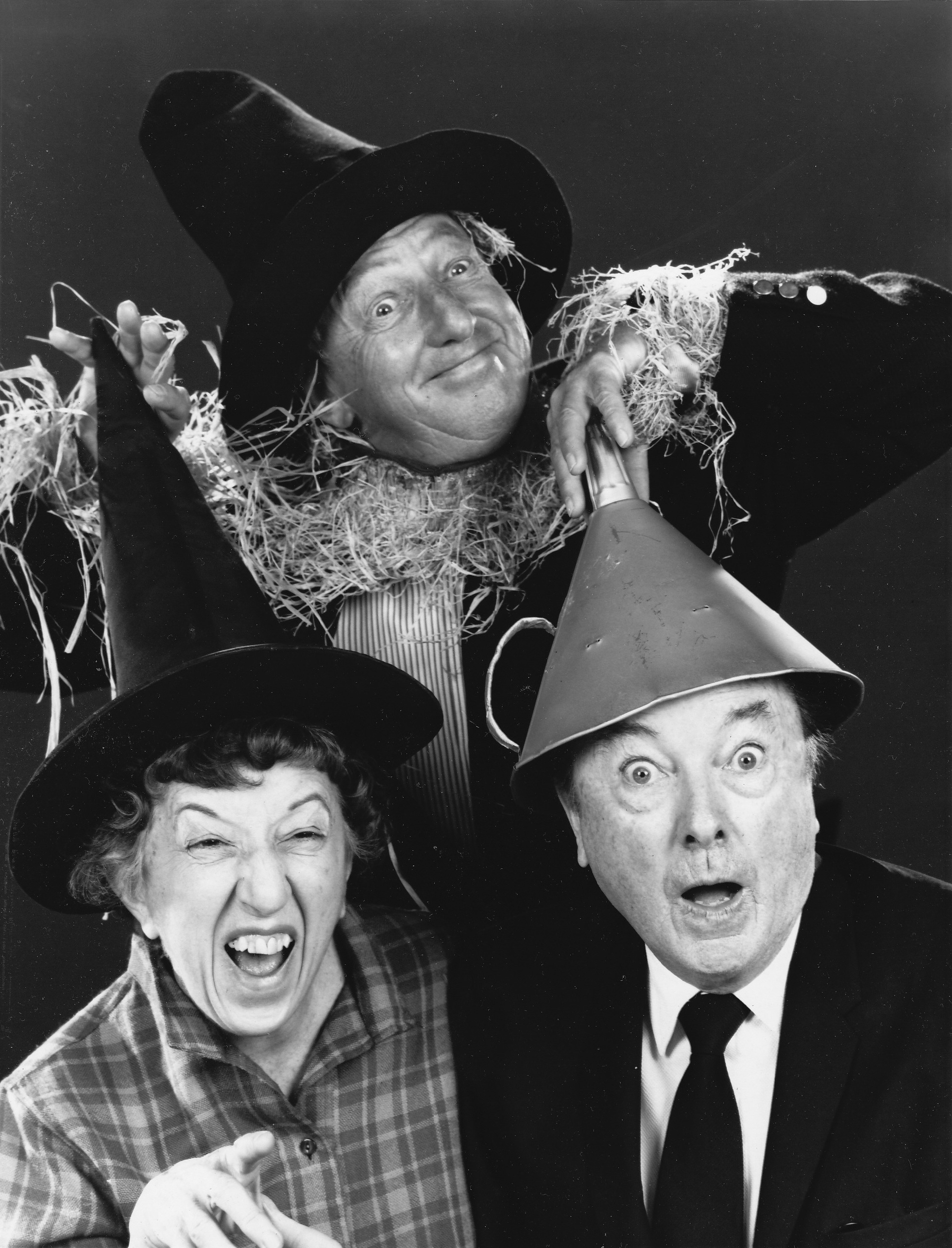
Margaret Hamilton, Ray Bolger and Jack Haley reunited in 1970

Metro-Goldwyn-Mayer hired Haley for the part of the Tin Man in The Wizard of Oz. He replaced song-and-dance comedian Buddy Ebsen, who had suffered a severe allergic reaction after inhaling aluminum powder from his silver face makeup, which triggered a congenital bronchial condition; the dust settled in Ebsen's lungs and, within a few days of principal photographic testing, he found himself struggling to breathe. For Haley, to avoid the same problem, the dust was converted into a paste—even so, the paste caused an eye infection that sidelined Haley for four shooting days. Surgical treatment averted serious or permanent damage to Haley's eyes. Haley also portrayed the Tin Man's Kansas counterpart, Hickory Twicker, one of Aunt Em and Uncle Henry's farmhands.

Haley did not remember the makeup or the costume fondly. Interviewed about the film years later by Tom Snyder, he related that many fans assumed making the film was a fun experience. Haley said, "Like hell it was. It was work!" For his role as the Tin Woodman, Haley spoke in the same soft tone he used when reading bedtime stories to his children. Oz was one of only three films Haley made for MGM. The others were Pick a Star, a 1937 Hal Roach production distributed by Metro-Goldwyn-Mayer, and Mr. Cinderella in 1936.

== Personal life ==
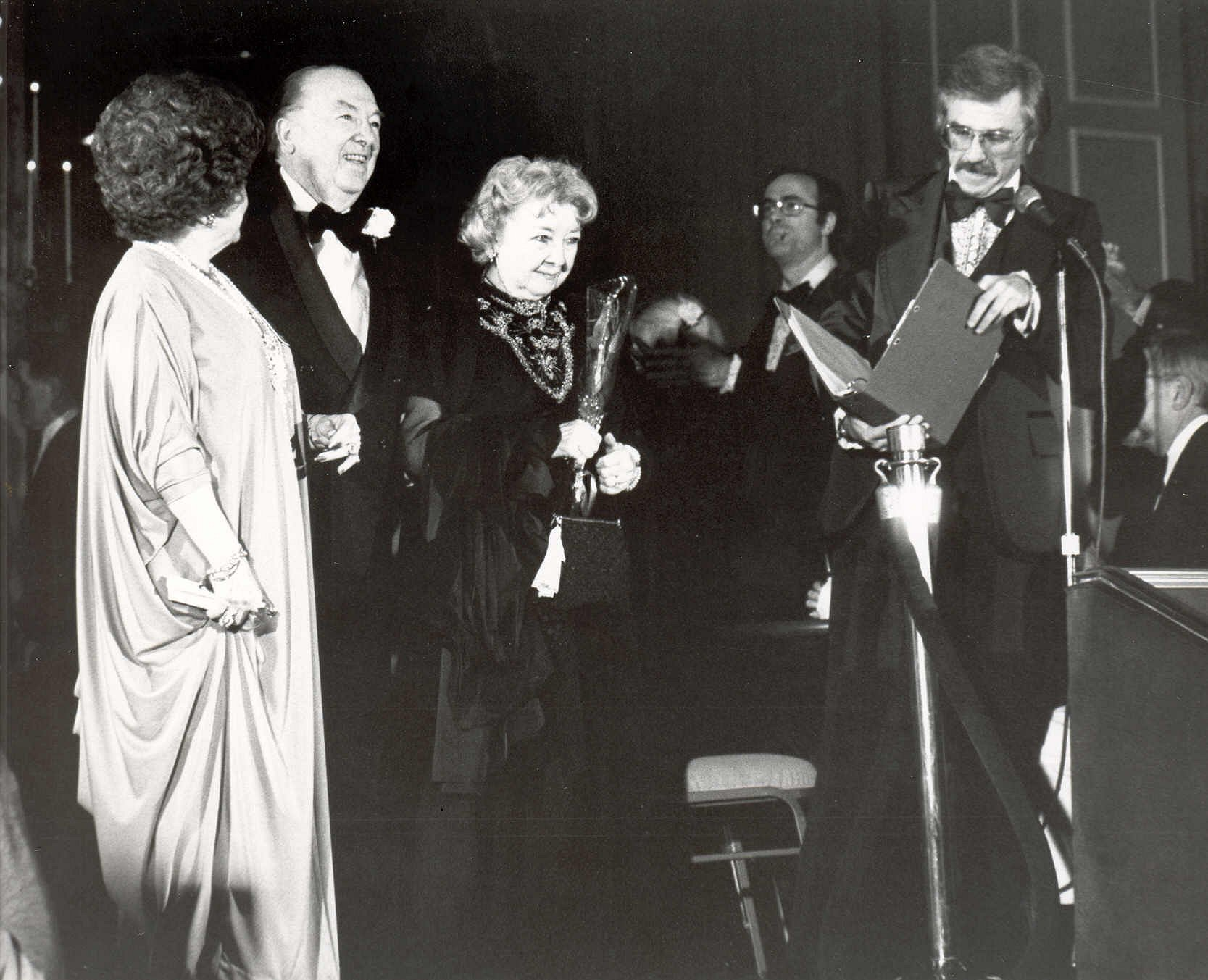
Haley (second from left) at the National Film Society Convention on May 30, 1979, (one week before his death)

Haley was raised Roman Catholic. He was a member of the Good Shepherd Parish and the Catholic Motion Picture Guild in Beverly Hills, California. His nephew Bob Dornan served as a Republican congressman for California.

=== Final years and death ===
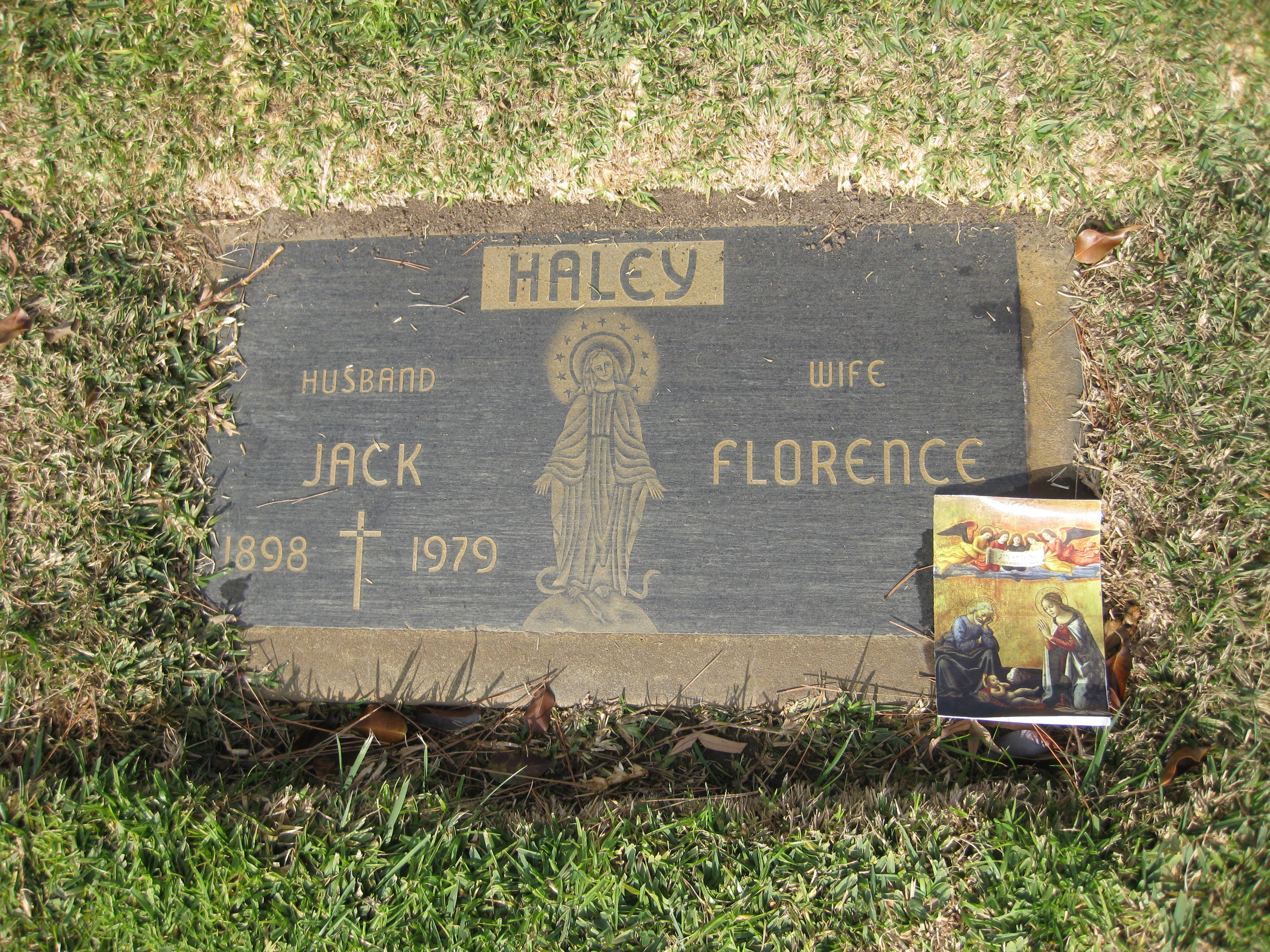
Jack and Florence Haley's grave at Holy Cross Cemetery, Culver City, California. Their son, Jack Haley Jr., is buried next to them.

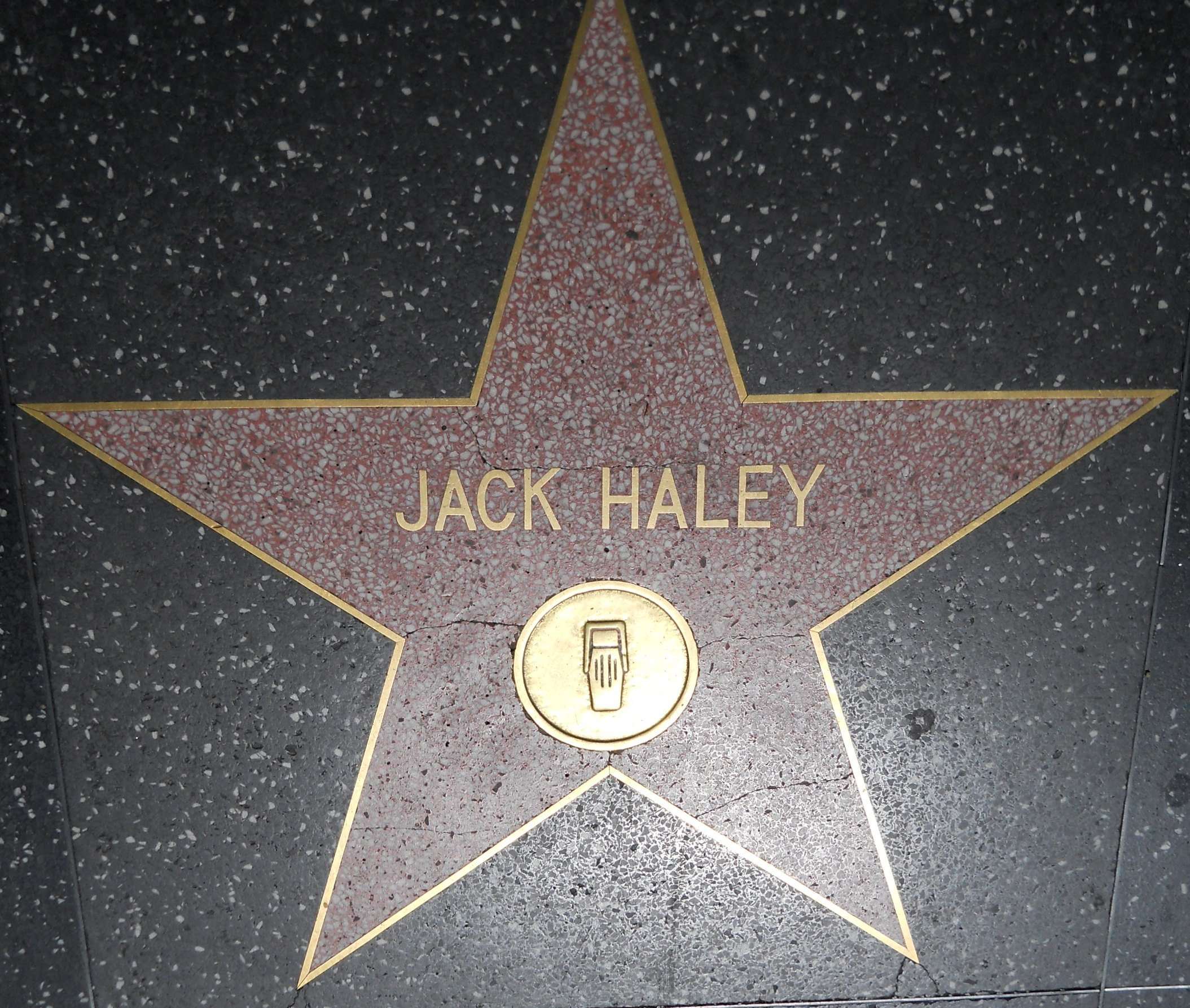
Star on the Hollywood Walk of Fame marking Haley's contribution to radio.

On June 1, 1979, Haley suffered a heart attack. He died on June 6, 1979, at the UCLA Medical Center in Los Angeles at the age of 80. His funeral was held at the Church of the Good Shepherd and the eulogy was given by Ray Bolger who concluded it by saying, "It's going to be awfully lonely on that Yellow Brick Road now, Jack."

Haley is buried in Holy Cross Cemetery, Culver City, California. His Oz costar Ray Bolger would be buried in the same cemetery 8 years later.

Haley's autobiography, Heart of the Tin Man, was published in 2000.

== Film ==
Year	Title	Role	Director/Studio	Notes
1927	Broadway Madness	Radio Announcer	Burton L. King; Excellent Pictures	Film debut Lost film
1930	Follow Thru	Jack Martin	Lloyd Corrigan and Laurence Schwab; Paramount	Performer: Button Up Your Overcoat
1933	Mr. Broadway	Jack Haley	Johnnie Walker and Edgar G. Ulmer; Broadway-Hollywood Productions	
1933	Sitting Pretty	Pete Pendleton	Harry Joe Brown; Paramount	Performer: You're Such a Comfort to Me; I Wanna Meander with Miranda and Good Morning Glory
1934	Here Comes the Groom	Mike Scanlon	Edward Sedgwick; Paramount	
1935	Spring Tonic	Sykes	Clyde Bruckman; Fox Film Corporation	
1935	Redheads on Parade	Peter Mathews	Norman Z. McLeod; Fox Film Corporation	
1935	The Girl Friend	Henry H. Henry	Edward Buzzell; Columbia Pictures	Performer: What is This Power and Two Together
1935	Coronado	Chuck Hornbostel	Norman Z. McLeod; Paramount	Performer: All's Well in Coronado by the Sea and Keep Your Fingers Crossed
1936	F-Man	Johnny Dime	Edward F. Cline; Paramount	
1936	Poor Little Rich Girl	Jimmy Dolan	Irving Cummings; 20th Century Fox	Performer: You've got to Eat your Spinach Baby and Military Man
1936	Mr. Cinderella	Joe Jenkins/ Aloysius P. Merriweather	Edward Sedgwick; MGM	
1936	Pigskin Parade	Winston 'Slug' Winters	David Butler; 20th Century Fox	Performer: You Do the Darndest Things Baby and The Balboa
1937	Pick a Star	Joe Jenkins	Edward Sedgwick; MGM	Performer: Pick A Star and I've Got It Bad
1937	She Had to Eat	Danny Decker	Malcolm St. Clair; 20th Century Fox	
1937	Wake Up and Live	Eddie Kane	Sidney Lanfield; 20th Century Fox	
1937	Danger – Love at Work	Henry MacMorrow	Otto Preminger; 20th Century Fox	Performer: Danger Love at Work; Uncredited
1937	Ali Baba Goes to Town	Himself – Cameo	David Butler; 20th Century Fox	Uncredited
1938	Rebecca of Sunnybrook Farm	Orville Smithers	Allan Dwan; 20th Century Fox	Performer: Alone With You
1938	Alexander's Ragtime Band	Davey Lane	Henry King; 20th Century Fox	Performer: Oh! How I Hate to Get Up in the Morning; That International Rag and In My Harem (DVD extra only)
1938	Hold That Co-ed	Wilber Peters	George Marshall; 20th Century Fox	
1938	Thanks for Everything	Henry Smith	William A. Seiter; 20th Century Fox	
1939	The Wizard of Oz	Hickory / The Tin Man	Victor Fleming; MGM	(writer, uncredited); Performer: If I Only Had a Heart and The Merry Old Land of Oz
1941	Moon Over Miami	Jack O'Hara	Walter Lang; 20th Century Fox	Performer: Is That Good?
1941	Navy Blues	'Powerhouse' Bolton	Lloyd Bacon; Warner Bros.	Performer: When are we Going to Land Abroad
1942	Beyond the Blue Horizon	Squidge Sullivan	Alfred Santell; Paramount	
1944	Higher and Higher	Mike O'Brien	Tim Whelan; RKO Pictures	Performer: Today I'm a Debutante and The Music Stopped
1944	Take It Big	Jack North	Frank McDonald; Paramount	Performer: Take It Big
1944	One Body Too Many	Albert Tuttle	Frank McDonald; Paramount	
1945	Scared Stiff	Larry Elliot	Frank McDonald; Paramount	
1945	George White's Scandals	Jack Evans	Felix E. Feist; RKO Pictures	
1945	Sing Your Way Home	Steve Kimball	Anthony Mann; RKO Pictures	
1946	People Are Funny	Pinky Wilson	Sam White; Paramount	Performer: Hey Jose
1946	Vacation in Reno	Jack Caroll	Leslie Goodwins; RKO Pictures	Last major film before retirement from motion pictures
1970	Norwood	Mr. Reese	Jack Haley, Jr. Paramount	Directed by his son producer/director Jack Haley Jr.
1977	New York, New York	Master of Ceremonies	Martin Scorsese; United Artists	This film marked Jack Haley's final screen appearance. Uncredited, (final film role)

== Short films ==
Year	Movie title	Role	Notes
1928	Haleyisms	Jack Haley	Also stars his wife Flo McFadden; Vitaphone production reel #2269
1930	The 20th Amendment	Wallace Moore	
1930	Success	Elmer	Performer: "Just a Gigolo"; Vitaphone production reel #1257–1258
1932	The Imperfect Lover		Vitaphone production reel #1324–1325
1932	Absent Minded Abner	Abner	Vitaphone production reel #1372–1373
1932	Sherlock's Home		Vitaphone production reel #1441–1442
1932	Then Came the Yawn		
1933	The Build Up		Vitaphone production reel #1444–1445
1933	Wrongorilla	Elmer	Vitaphone production reel #1486-1484
1933	Hollywood on Parade No. A-9	Himself	
1933	An Idle Roomer		Vitaphone production reel #1531–1532
1933	Nothing but the Tooth	Smilie Jones	Performer: "Smiles"; Vitaphone production reel #1542–1543
1933	Salt Water Daffy	Elmer Wagonbottom	
1939	Screen Snapshots Series 18, No. 9	Himself	Documentary/News Reel
1946	Screen Snapshots: The Skolsky Party	Himself	Documentary/News Reel
1946	Screen Snapshots: Famous Fathers and Sons	Himself	Documentary/News Reel

== Broadway ==
Title	Role	Run	Theater	Notes
Round the Town	Jack Haley	May 21, 1924 – May 31, 1924	Century Promenade Theatre	15 performances
Gay Paree	Jack Haley	August 18, 1925 – January 30, 1926	Shubert Theatre	181 performances
Gay Paree	Jack Haley	November 9, 1926 – April 9, 1927	Winter Garden Theatre	192 performances
Follow Thru	Jack Martin	January 9, 1929 – December 21, 1929	Chanin's 46th Theatre	401 performances Sang: Button Up Your Overcoat with Zelma O'Neal; In 1930, he starred in Technicolor's film version
Free For All	Steve Potter Jr.	September 8, 1931 – September 19, 1931	Manhattan Theatre	15 performances
Take a Chance	Jack Stanley	November 26, 1932 – July 1, 1933	Apollo Theatre	243 performances
Higher and Higher	Zachary Ash	April 4, 1940 – June 15, 1940	Shubert Theatre	84 performances
Higher and Higher	Zachary Ash	August 5, 1940 – August 24, 1940	Shubert Theatre	24 performances In 1943, he starred with Frank Sinatra in film version
Show Time	Jack Haley	September 16, 1942 – April 3, 1943	Broadhurst Theatre	342 performances
Inside U.S.A.	Jack Haley	April 30, 1948 – February 19, 1949	New Century Theatre and Majestic Theatre	399 performances
