= John Vivyan =

American actor

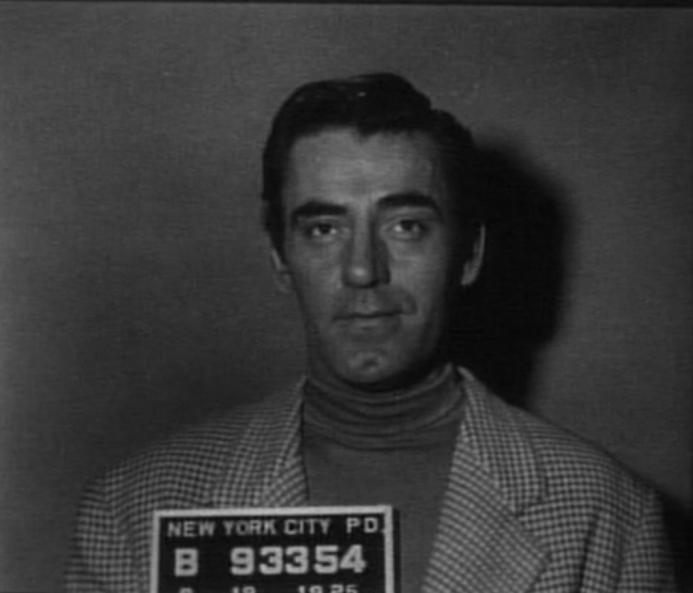
- Vivyan in The Lawless Years, 1959
- Born: John R. Vukayan; May 31, 1915; Pittsburgh, Pennsylvania, United States
- Died: December 20, 1983 (aged 68); Santa Monica, California
- Education: American Academy of Dramatic Arts
- Occupation: Actor
- Years active: 1946–1983
- Military career
- Allegiance: United States
- Branch: U.S. Army
- Service years: 1941–1944
- Rank: Corporal
- Service number: 36017866
- Unit: 132nd Infantry Regiment
- Conflicts: World War II; Guadalcanal Campaign; Battle for Mt Austen
- Awards: Bronze Star; Purple Heart

John Vivyan (né John R. Vukayan; May 31, 1915 – December 20, 1983) was an American stage and television actor, who was best known for portraying the title character in the television series Mr. Lucky.

== Early life ==
John R. Vukayan was born in Pittsburgh, Pennsylvania, to parents of Serbian background. His family moved to Chicago when he was an infant. He attended the Serbian Orthodox Church on Schiller Street as a boy, where he sang in the choir. After a year at Lake View High School, he dropped out to start work.

He was employed by the Continental Can Company in Chicago during October 1940, when he registered for the draft as John Vukayan. The Draft Registrar recorded him as being 6'3" and weighing 185 pounds, with brown eyes and hair, and a scar on his forehead.

== Military service ==
Two months before his 26th birthday, on April 8, 1941, he enlisted in the US Army. His enlistment papers carried the name "John R. Vukayan", and noted he was a citizen, single, had completed one year of high school, and was semi-skilled in metal working. He was assigned to the 132nd Infantry Regiment (Illinois National Guard), which deployed overseas to Australia in January 1942. From there his regiment moved to New Caledonia in March 1942, eventually forming part of the Americal Division. His regiment was sent to take part in the Battle of Guadalcanal on December 8, 1942, and within a week was engaged in fighting off Japanese infiltrators. John was a corporal with Company E of the 2nd Battalion, which was thrown into the Battle for Mt Austen on January 2, 1943. The battalion suffered heavy casualties during the fighting, one of whom was John, his left leg hit by gunfire.

Evacuated from the Solomon Islands on January 6, 1943, he would spend the next fourteen months in Army hospitals recovering from his wounds. He later recounted that the Army doctors had several times considered amputating the leg. He was eventually moved stateside to a hospital in Michigan, where he recalled meeting actress Loretta Young when she visited wounded soldiers. Awarded a Purple Heart and Bronze Star he was judged unfit for further active service and was discharged from the Army on March 23, 1944. The injury to his left leg would continue to bother him and limit his physical activity for years to come.

== Early stage career ==
While pondering his career options during his long convalescence, John became interested in the theater. In June 1946 he starts appearing as "John Vivyan" among the cast of the Barter Theatre group's junior company, at the "Barter Colony" near Abingdon, Virginia. The circumstances of his stage name's adoption are not known, and from later sources it is apparent he retained "John R. Vukayan" as his legal name until at least 1960.

The Barter Theatre provided free room and board for prospective actors but no pay. When not performing, they were expected to help out with sets, lighting, and costumes, as well as work in the lodging and cafeteria used by the troupe. It was a lifestyle that appealed to many recently discharged veterans, thirty-six of whom, including Vivyan, were inducted into the American Legion at a ceremony in July 1946. Performances had short runs, often no more than two evenings and a matinee. At the time, the Barter Theatre group had no venue of its own, so plays were performed at the Municipal Theatre in nearby Abingdon. The Barter Theatre performers also entertained at local social clubs; Vivyan sang Serbian folk songs at one such event.

Vivyan finished out his time with the Barter Theatre group during a 1946-47 winter tour of Virginia and South Carolina, in which the troupe alternated the plays Arms and the Man and Much Ado About Nothing.

== Summer stock and New York television ==
In 1947, Vivyan moved to Manhattan. He used his G.I. Bill money to pay for lessons at the American Academy of Dramatic Arts there. After graduating, however, he was unable to find any acting jobs. He later told an interviewer that this was a grim period in his life. He scraped by on doing summer stock theatre, performing work disdained by established actors for its low pay and grueling pace.

He also found work in the new television industry, doing a couple of minor roles each year from 1949 thru 1954. New York City was a creative center for early live television, particularly anthology series, which featured a new story and cast with each episode. Film actors disliked the pressure of performing live, so an out of work stage actor had an advantage.

After years of near obscurity, Vivyan caught a break in 1952. He was cast opposite June Havoc in a summer touring company production of W. Somerset Maugham's Rain. This two-month tour provided Vivyan with the time to hone his portrayal of the unfortunate Rev. Davidson, drawing good reviews in several cities. He followed this success with a late summer engagement in a Noël Coward play, On Approval, with the popular Arthur Treacher casting reflected glory on his younger co-star.

Following those off-season successes, Vivyan landed a role in a high season production of a recent Broadway musical. Joan Blondell was the star of a multi-city tour for A Tree Grows in Brooklyn, with Vivyan playing her romantic interest. The tour opened in Bridgeport, went to Boston and Washington, D. C., before finishing in Chicago. At the latter, the local paper noted he attended services and sang with the choir at the same Serbian Orthodox Church to which he belonged growing up.

The following years were less successful. Vivyan had only a few weeks acting during August 1953 with the musical Lady in the Dark, performed al fresco at Pitt Stadium, which starred Billie Worth and included Lee Bergere and a young Shirley Jones among the cast. This was followed by an even quicker stint in a new play about the United Nations, called The Paradise Question. Starring Leon Ames, the show lasted only two weeks in New Haven, Connecticut and Philadelphia.

== West Coast television ==
From 1954-56, Vivyan did a few television shows on the West Coast, even as his New York television work seemed to slow down. He also had an uncredited role in his first film, a Hitchcock docudrama called The Wrong Man. He still traveled between the coasts for stage work, but that ceased with 1957, when he did episodes of eight television shows in Hollywood, followed by eight more in 1958. From then on, he resided permanently in Southern California.

Where his stage roles had largely seen him play lovers, his television roles were at first as victims and then heavies. By 1959 his schedule was filled with TV roles, on a dozen different series, with many featuring multiple appearances. He also did a second film, Imitation of Life, before being cast as the star in a new Blake Edwards series.

He thrived on the fast pace and handling different characters, but faced a physical challenge with the many Western shows he was doing. He had no prior experience at riding a horse, and the necessity for a rider's left leg being the focal point for mounting and dismounting limited his ability to do so. More than one producer solved the problem by putting his character into a horse-drawn buggy instead.

== Mr. Lucky ==
Producer Blake Edwards had a hit with his unconventional TV detective show Peter Gunn in 1958–59, and decided to create another show around an equally unlikely protagonist. For the 1959-60 television season he sold CBS and two sponsors on Mr. Lucky, a professional gambler who helped out others. As with Peter Gunn actor Craig Stevens, Vivyan was cast by Edwards for the way his appearance and style suggested film star Cary Grant. Edwards even took both lead actors to his own tailor, to ensure their clothes projected a debonair style. Vivyan's own comment to an interviewer was "Nobody said I looked like Grant before this series".

The show was an immediate success, helped considerably by the Henry Mancini theme music and the presence of actor Ross Martin as "Andamo", Mr. Lucky's sidekick. Mr. Lucky had his gambling operation on a yacht called Fortuna II, anchored just beyond the then 3 mile legal limit for a major California port. Tom Brown played "Lt. Rovacs", a police officer who was grudgingly helpful to Mr. Lucky and Andamo.

Pippa Scott played a recurring character who served as Mr Lucky's occasional love interest. Off-camera, she reportedly called John Vivyan "Vookie", as a teasing reference to his real last name and the then popular character of "Kookie" on 77 Sunset Strip. The real name of the character Mr. Lucky was never heard during the series, though a CBS network press release announcing a mid-season format change identified it as "Lucky Santell".

The show used a former Las Vegas casino dealer named Joe Scott as the technical advisor for gambling. He also played a dealer on the Fortuna II then its maitre d' after the casino yacht was converted to a restaurant.

Despite critical acclaim and high ratings, Mr. Lucky was cancelled by CBS. Newspaper columnists offered several possible reasons, and for a while there was an effort by the producers to sell the show to other networks, but to no avail. Thus, Vivyan's fall from fame was almost as fast as his rise.

== Later career and life ==
Vivyan once complained to a columnist that being on CBS limited the guest spots he could accept for that network's own shows. Having gone through lean periods, he was inclined to pursue performing opportunities whenever they arose. Following the cancellation of Mr. Lucky, he resumed doing stage work in between television shows. He also did another film, Rider on a Dead Horse (1962), and voice-over work for an animated short in 1963. He had a brief recurring role as the gangster Lepke Buchalter on The Lawless Years, but most of his other television work was for single appearances. These tapered off quickly to two or three shows a year, then became more infrequent after Vivyan turned fifty in 1965. His stage work also ceased about the same time.

He did no performing work for seven years after open heart surgery, at age sixty, in 1975. He resumed doing television in 1982, appearing on commercials and an episode each of two popular shows, WKRP in Cincinnati and Simon & Simon. The latter show was broadcast just two weeks before he died of heart failure at Santa Monica Hospital on December 20, 1983.

== Personal life ==
Vivyan told a newspaper columnist that he had tried marriage once, but it did not work out. There is no readily-available public record of his marriage, and he continued to be regarded as an eligible bachelor while active in show business. During 1958, he dated Ellen Powell, the daughter of Joan Blondell and Dick Powell. Later, he was said to occasionally date actress Nita Talbot, among others.

According to newspapers, he owned a cabin cruiser that he used for deep sea fishing. He lived in a modest apartment on Sweetzer Avenue in West Hollywood during most of his peak popularity. His main hobby was woodworking and hand restoring old furniture that he would buy from second-hand shops. He told an interviewer that he had not gambled since his Army days as "I get no kicks out of it".

== Stage performances ==
Listed by year of first performance
Year	Play	Role	Venue	Notes
1946	Stage Door	Keith Burgess	Barter Theatre	His first credited performance; a reviewer placed him in a different role, that of "David Kingsley"
1946	My Sister Eileen	Wreck Loomis	Barter Theatre	A co-star in this production was USN veteran and future character actor Karl Lukas
1946	Arms and the Man	Russian Officer	Barter Theatre	Governor William Tuck attended this revival performance
1946	Much Ado About Nothing	Balthasar / Third Watch	Barter Theatre	Both John Vivyan and Karl Lukas doubled up on parts in this staging
1950	Two Blind Mice	Tommy Thurston	Chapel Playhouse, Guilford	His first leading role, for a summer stock production
1950	Life With Father		Chapel Playhouse, Guilford	
1950	Goodbye, My Fancy	Matt Cole	Chapel Playhouse, Guilford	From the 1948 Broadway hit written by Fay Kanin
1950	Born Yesterday	Paul Verrell	Chapel Playhouse, Guilford	
1950	Harvey	Dr. Sanderson	Chapel Playhouse, Guilford	
1950	You Have To Be Crazy	Ned Vernon	Chapel Playhouse, Guilford	Written by the Chapel Playhouse's director, Charlotte Buchwald
1950	Private Lives	Elyot	Chapel Playhouse, Guilford	John Vivyan's grueling summer ended with his seventh major role
1952	Rain	Rev. Henry Davidson	Summer Circuit Tour	June Havoc starred in this production of the 1922 Broadway play
1952	On Approval	Richard Halton	Casino Theatre, Newport	Following a two-month tour, Vivyan did this week-long engagement
1952	A Tree Grows in Brooklyn	Harry	Touring Company	Vivyan played opposite Joan Blondell in a tour of major cities
1953	Lady in the Dark	Randy Curtis	Pitt Stadium	Billie Worth was the star for this production of the 1941 Broadway musical
1953	The Paradise Question	Abdullah Ibn Rashid	Touring Company	Leon Ames headed the cast in this original production
1954	Wish You Were Here	Pinky Harris	Music Hall at Fair Park	Summer production for the Texas State Fair starred Gale Storm
1955	Starlight, Star Bright		Westport Country Playhouse	Terry Moore starred in this original production
1955	Oh Men! Oh Women!	Arthur Turner	Clinton Playhouse, CT	Walter Abel starred in this adaption from the Broadway hit
1955	Wish You Were Here	Pinky Harris	Music Circus	This was John's second time playing this role
1963	Tchin-Tchin	Caesario Grimaldi	Touring Company	With co-star Martha Scott this production played Miami and Los Angeles
1964	Tovarich	Mikail	Music Hall at Fair Park	He had second billing to star Ginger Rogers in this musical

== Filmography ==
Film (by year of first release)
Year	Title	Role	Notes
1956	The Wrong Man	Det. Holman	An uncredited part in a Hitchcock docudrama was his first known film role
1959	Imitation of Life	Young Man	
1962	Rider on a Dead Horse	Hayden	
1963	The Plain Man's Guide to Advertising	(Voice)	An animated short

Television (in original broadcast order)
Year	Series	Episode	Role	Notes
1949	Studio One	Two Sharp Knives	Policeman	New York based anthology series
1950	Studio One	Give Us Our Dream		Based on a 1947 novel, it starred Josephine Hull
1950-51	Martin Kane, Private Eye	3 Episodes		That he did three episodes is known only from later interviews
1952	Celanese Theater	The Petrified Forest	Gangster	He was uncredited in this New York based anthology series
1952	Man Against Crime			Vivyan's character was killed by mobsters
1953	Omnibus	A Lodging For The Night		Starred Yul Brynner, Vivyan played murder victem
1953	Rocket Rangers			His character suffers a broken neck
1954	Robert Montgomery Presents	The Pink Hippopotamus		His character is gunned down by Russian soldiers
1954	Justice			His last known New York TV work
1954	The Jack Benny Program			His first known West Coast TV work had him play a drunk
1955	Producers' Showcase	Cyrano de Bergerac		A live color production that starred Jose Ferrer
1956	Matinee Theatre	The Password		Elena Verdugo was his co-star
1957	Dr. Christian	The Bite	Brother Jonas	
1957	Highway Patrol	Nitro	Richard Goff	
1957	The Joseph Cotten Show	Alibi For Murder	Harry	
1957	State Trooper	Safe on a Boat	Gil Henderson	
1957	The Millionaire	The Laura Hunter Story	Bart Hewitt	
1957	The Loretta Young Show	The Little Witness	Mack Barron	
1957	Maverick	The Quick and the Dead	John Stacey	
1957	Tombstone Territory	Desert Survival	Glade Rafferty	
1958	Colt .45	Mirage	George F. Foley	
1958	Sugarfoot	Deadlock	Victor Valla	
1958	Maverick	Blackfire	Cousin Millard	
1958	Adventures of Superman	The Gentle Monster	Duke	
1958	Harbor Command	The Psychiatrist	Leon Faulkner	
1958	Maverick	The Judas Mask	Walter Osbourne	
1958	Walt Disney Presents	Ambush in Laredo	Marlowe	An uncredited role in this installment of Disney's Texas John Slaughter
1958	Rough Riders	The Counterfeiters	Brink Mantell	
1959	The Life and Legend of Wyatt Earp	Last Stand at Smokey Hill	Hoarce Collins	
1959	77 Sunset Strip	The Girl Who Couldn't Remember	Mitch Abercrombie	
1959	Yancy Derringer	Duel at the Oaks	Charles LeBow	
1959	Rawhide	Incident of the Dog Days	Toby Clark	
1959	Bat Masterson	A Matter of Honor	Chip Grimes	
1959	The Life and Legend of Wyatt Earp	Dodge Is Civilized	Mike DeGraff	
1959	The Life and Legend of Wyatt Earp	Kelly Was Irish	Mike DeGraff	
1959	The Texan	The Smiling Loser	George Nolan	
1959	Mackenzie's Raiders	Ambush	Sam Bates	
1959	The Lawless Years	Four the Hard Way	Big Ziggy Adams	
1959	Men into Space	Moon Probe	Ground Controller	
1959	The Lawless Years	The Big Greeny Story	Lepke	
1959	Tombstone Territory	Red Terror of Tombstone	Howard Mansfield	
1959	Not For Hire	The Soldier's Story	Bruno	
1959	Mr. Lucky	(All 34 Episodes)	Mr. Lucky	Weekly on Saturday evenings from Oct 24, 1959 thru June 18, 1960
1959	The Lawless Years	The Big Man	Louis Otto	
1959	Walt Disney Presents	The Robber Stallion	Jason Hemp	Another role in Disney's Texas John Slaughter
1959	Walt Disney Presents	Wild Horse Revenge	Jason Hemp	Continuation of Disney's Texas John Slaughter
1959	Maverick	A Cure For Johnny Rain	Tinhorn	
1960	Lock-Up	Poker Club	Tony Alden	
1960	Bat Masterson	The Hunter	Sir Edward Marston	
1960	The Dinah Shore Chevy Show	Arabian Nights	Sinbad the Sailor	
1961	Death Valley Days	The Lady Was an M.D.	Ed Taylor	
1961	The Lawless Years	Louy K:Part 2 Sing Sing	Lepke	
1961	The Lawless Years	Louy K:Part 3 Birth of the Organization	Lepke	
1961	The Lawless Years	Louy K:Part 4 Heyday of the Organization	Lepke	
1961	The Lawless Years	Louy K:Part 5 The Disintegation	Lepke	
1961	The Lawless Years	Ike, The Novelty King	Lepke	
1961	King of Diamonds	Diamonds Come in Cans	Captain Leo Talvo	
1962	King of Diamonds	The Magic Act	Sutton	
1962	The Beachcomber	The Larcenous Lover	Tim O'Hara	
1962	Death Valley Days	Showdown at Kamaaina Flats	Jeremy Whitlock	
1962	His Model Wife	(Pilot)	John Lauran	John and Jeanne Crain co-starred in this unsold pilot
1963	The Lucy Show	Lucy Becomes a Reporter	Argyle Nelson	
1963	Empire	Down There, the World	Shelly Hanson	
1963	Rawhide	Incident of White Eyes	Beaumont Butler	
1964	Petticoat Junction	Visit From a Big Star	Lane Haggard	
1964	Daniel Boone	Not in Our Stars	Major Halpern	
1967	Mr. Terrific	Try This on For Spies	Boris Boraser	
1968	Batman	Penguin's Clean Sweep	Bank Manager	An uncredited role that marks how quickly fame fades
1970	Paris 7000	To Cage a Lion	Jacques	
1970	The F.B.I.	The Witness	George Petrarkis	
1971	The Smith Family	Taste of Fear	Craig Saunders	
1974	Police Story	Wolf	Sgt. Grady	A few months after this episode aired John Vivyan had open heart surgery
1982	WKRP in Cincinnati	Jennifer and Johnny's Charity	Mr. Mittenhof	
1983	Simon & Simon	Betty Grable Flies Again	Farley	Broadcast on December 8, 1983, two weeks before John Vivyan's death
