= Silver Bells =

1950 Christmas song

- Sheet music

Song by Bing Crosby and Carol Richards with John Scott Trotter and his Orchestra and the Lee Gordon Singers
- Released: October 1950
- Genre: Christmas
- Songwriters: Jay Livingston, Ray Evans

"Silver Bells" is a Christmas song composed by Jay Livingston and Ray Evans.

It debuted in the motion picture The Lemon Drop Kid (1951), where it was started by William Frawley, then sung in the generally known version immediately thereafter by Bob Hope and Marilyn Maxwell. The first recorded version was by Bing Crosby and Carol Richards on September 8, 1950, with John Scott Trotter and His Orchestra and the Lee Gordon Singers. The record was released by Decca Records in October 1950. When the recording became popular, Hope and Maxwell were called back in late 1950 to re-shoot a more elaborate production of the song.

== History ==
"Silver Bells" started out as "Tinkle Bells". Songwriter Ray Evans said: "We never thought that tinkle had a double meaning until Jay went home and his first wife said, 'Are you out of your mind? Do you know what the word tinkle is?'"

This song's inspiration is the source of conflicting reports. Several periodicals and interviews cite writer Jay Livingston stating that the song's inspiration came from the bells used by sidewalk Santa Clauses and Salvation Army solicitors on New York City street corners. However, in an interview with NPR, co-writer Ray Evans said that the song was inspired by a bell that sat on an office desk that he shared with Livingston. Evans's hometown of Salamanca, New York has taken credit for being the city mentioned in the song's lyrics and holds a "Silver Bells in the City" festival each December.

Kate Smith's 1966 version of "Silver Bells" became popular and has since been featured prominently in film and on holiday albums. Stevie Wonder recorded a version that was released in 1967, while Elvis Presley recorded a version that was released in 1971. The song was recorded by American country duo the Judds and was released as a single in 1987, charting for one week in 1998 at No. 68 on the Hot Country Songs chart. In 2009, the song charted in the United Kingdom for the first time when a duet by Terry Wogan and Aled Jones that had been recorded for charity reached the Top 40, peaking at No. 27. The Andy Williams version was also featured in the 2025 film Novocaine.

== See also ==
- List of Christmas carols
