= Billie Worth =

American theater actress (1916–2016)

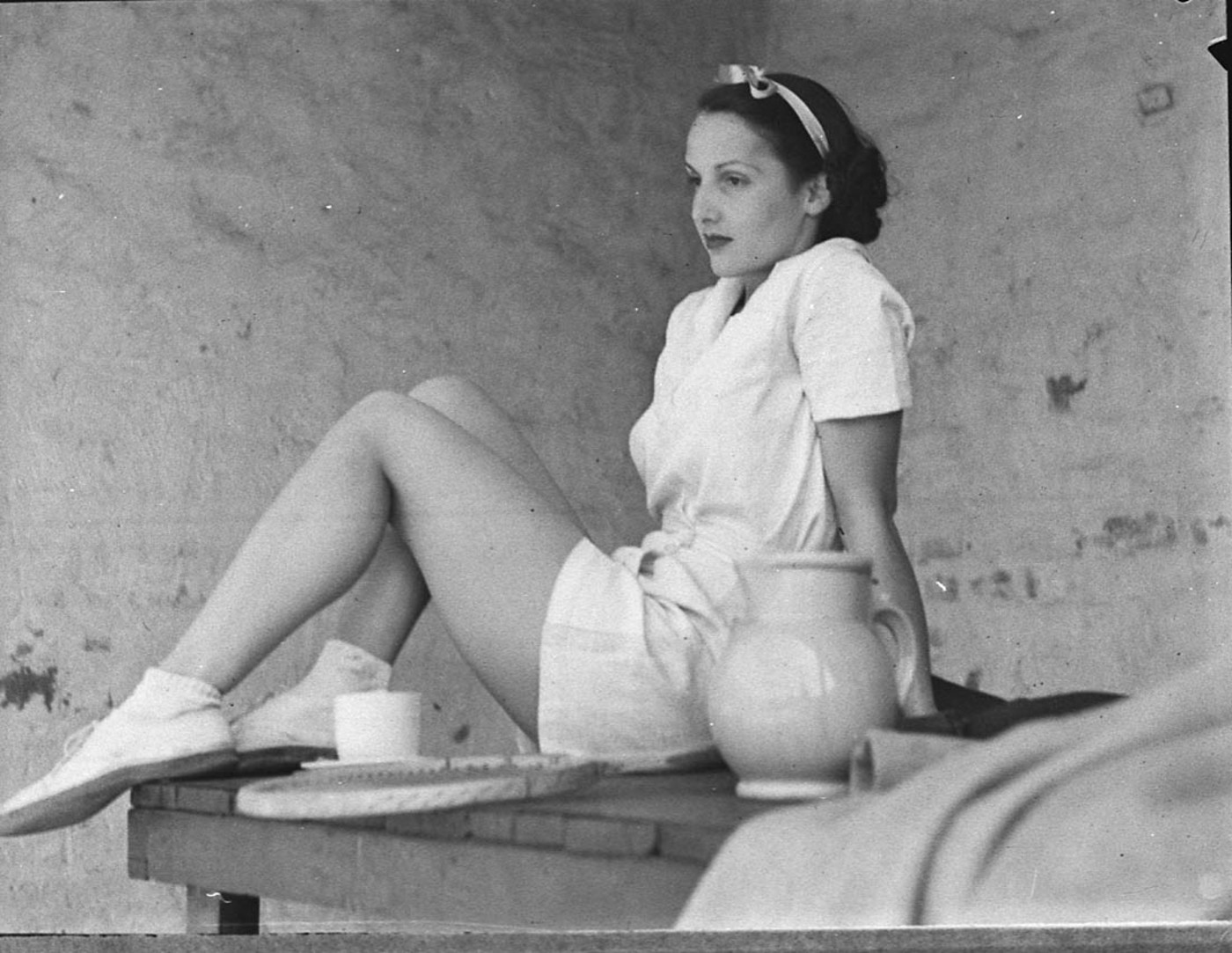
- Actress Billy Worth dressed for tennis, 6 October 1937, Sydney, by Sam Hood
- Born: Wilhelmina E. Rothmund; October 20, 1916; Rome, New York, U.S.
- Died: December 3, 2016 (aged 100)
- Other names: Billy Worth, Billie Worth Burr
- Occupation(s): Actor, tennis player
- Known for: Thumbs Up! (1934), Higher and Higher (1940), Bright Lights of 1944 (1943), Jackpot (1944), Seven Lively Arts (1944), South Pacific (1949), and Courtin' Time (1951).

Billie Worth (born Wilhelmina E. Rothmund; October 20, 1916 – December 3, 2016) was an American actress who performed on Broadway and in other venues from regional theater in the United States to European capitals. Her name is sometimes seen as Billy Worth, and she is also known as Billie Worth Burr.

== Life and career ==
Worth was born as Wilhelmina Rothmund in Rome, New York on October 20, 1916, as a member of a show business family. In her youth, her tennis skills made her a ranking junior player in the Eastern states.

Worth's Broadway credits included Thumbs Up! (1934), Higher and Higher (1940), Bright Lights of 1944 (1943), Jackpot (1944), Seven Lively Arts (1944), South Pacific (1949), and Courtin' Time (1951). In 1953, she was called "the toast of the British Isles" for her performance as leading lady in a London production of Call Me Madam that ran for 18 months. She also played in Anything Goes in London and in five musical comedies in Australia. She performed in American regional theaters, including the Pittsburgh Civic Light Opera and Muny Opera in St. Louis, and she directed some regional productions.

In November 1935, Worth married Edgar Burr Lush, an actor who used the stage name Donald Burr. They had two children and remained together until Burr's death on February 27, 1979, at the age of 71. In the early 1970s, she sold real estate. Worth latterly lived in Wellington, Florida. She died on December 3, 2016, at the age of 100.
