= Rider on a Dead Horse =

Film directed by Herbert L. Strock

- Directed by: Herbert L. Strock
- Screenplay by: Stephen Longstreet
- Based on: James Edmiston (based on a story by)
- Produced by: Kenneth Altose
- Starring: John Vivyan
- Cinematography: Frank V. Phillips
- Edited by: Melvin Shapiro
- Music by: Joseph Hooven
- Color process: Black and white
- Production company: Phoenix Film Studios Productions
- Distributed by: Allied Artists Pictures
- Release date: May 27, 1962
- Running time: 72 minutes
- Country: United States
- Language: English

Rider on a Dead Horse is a 1962 American Western film directed by Herbert L. Strock and starring John Vivyan.

== Plot ==
Three gold prospectors bury their gold in a secret location but greed quickly reduces their number to two.

== Cast ==
- John Vivyan as Hayden
- Bruce Gordon as Barney Senn
- Kevin Hagen as Jake Fry
- Lisa Lu as Ming Kwai
