= Courtin' Time =

Musical

Courtin' Time is a musical adapted by William Roos from Eden Phillpotts's 1916 play The Farmer's Wife, with lyrics and music by Jack Lawrence and Don Walker.

Set in the state of Maine in the year 1898, the musical centers around the character of the widower Samuel Rilling who asks his long time housekeeper, Araminta, to aid him in finding a new wife. Araminta herself loves Samuel, but agrees to help him. After several potential candidates all end in failure for a variety of reasons, Rilling discovers that the ideal candidate is in fact Araminta.

Courtin' Time premiered on Broadway at the National Theatre on June 13, 1951 in a production directed by Alfred Drake with choreography by George Balanchine. Ralph Alswang was the production's lighting and scenic designer, and Saul Bolasni designed the costumes. The cast was led by Joe E. Brown as Samuel Rilling and Billie Worth as Araminta. Other cast members included Carmen Mathews as Theresa Tapper, Rosemary Kuhlmann as Sadie, and Joseph Sweeney as Mr. Hearn. In mid run the production moved to the Royale Theatre where it closed on July 14, 1951 after 37 performances.
