= Call Me Madam (film) =

1953 film by Walter Lang

- Original film poster
- Directed by: Walter Lang
- Screenplay by: Arthur Sheekman
- Based on: Call Me Madam; 1950 musical by Howard Lindsay; Russel Crouse
- Produced by: Sol C. Siegel
- Starring: Ethel Merman; Donald O'Connor; Vera-Ellen; George Sanders
- Cinematography: Leon Shamroy
- Edited by: Robert L. Simpson
- Music by: Irving Berlin (music and lyrics); Alfred Newman (musical director)
- Distributed by: 20th Century Fox
- Release date: March 4, 1953 (Los Angeles)
- Running time: 114 minutes
- Country: United States
- Language: English
- Budget: $2.46 million
- Box office: $2.85 million (US rental)

Call Me Madam is a 1953 American Technicolor musical film directed by Walter Lang, with songs by Irving Berlin, based on the 1950 stage musical of the same name. The film, with a screenplay by Arthur Sheekman, stars Ethel Merman, Donald O'Connor, Vera-Ellen, Billy DeWolfe, George Sanders, and Walter Slezak.

Merman won the Golden Globe Award for Best Actress in a Musical or Comedy. Music director Alfred Newman won the Oscar for Best Scoring of a Musical Picture, and Irene Sharaff was nominated for her costume design. Lang was nominated for Outstanding Directorial Achievement in Motion Pictures by the Directors Guild of America and the Grand Prize at the 1953 Cannes Film Festival; Sheekman's screenplay was nominated Best Written American Musical by the Writers Guild of America.

== Soundtrack ==
The film replaced "Washington Square Dance" with the older "International Rag", and interpolated "What Chance Have I With Love?" from Berlin's Louisiana Purchase (sung and danced by Donald O'Connor). A soundtrack album was released by Decca both as a 10-inch LP and as a set of three 7-inch EPs, and was released on CD in 2004 by Hallmark. "The Hostess with the Mostest'" and "You're Just in Love" are included on the Rhino Records CD set Irving Berlin in Hollywood. The film was out of circulation for many years, but was issued on DVD in 2004.

== Plot ==
A wealthy Washington, D.C., socialite, Sally Adams (Ethel Merman), has political connections and is appointed U.S. ambassador to the tiny country of Lichtenburg, even though nothing in her background qualifies her for the job. A young journalist, Kenneth Gibson (Donald O'Connor), persuades her to let him tag along as her press attaché.

In the duchy of Lichtenburg, the arrival of Ambassador Adams does not sit well with some, particularly chargé d'affaires Pemberton Maxwell (Billy De Wolfe), who is annoyed by many things, including her insistence on being addressed by him as "Madam." A pressing issue in Lichtenburg is that Princess Maria (Vera-Ellen), niece of Grand Duke Otto (Ludwig Stössel) and Grand Duchess Sophie (Lilia Skala), is about to have an arranged marriage to a neighboring land's Prince Hugo (Helmut Dantine), but lacks a sufficient dowry to make their union a fair bargain for both parties.

Knowing her republic's penchant for foreign aid, Sally is approached by Prime Minister Sebastian (Steven Geray) about asking her friend President Truman for a loan of $100 million, to the consternation of Lichtenburg's foreign minister, General Constantine (George Sanders), who wants his country to be independent and self-reliant. Sally finds herself attracted to Constantine, while after a chance meeting in a department store, Kenneth has developed a very impractical romantic interest in Princess Maria, who finds him charming as well.

After Prime Minister Sebastian informs Washington of Mrs. Adams’ interference in the royal wedding, she returns on the first boat home. At one of her social events, she is pleased to hear Constantine is among the guests, then disheartened at learning he has brought along a female companion. A happy ending for all ensues, however, when his date turns out to be Maria, who is willing to marry Kenneth and abdicate her royal title. Sally's future with Constantine seems assured, too.

== Cast ==
- Ethel Merman as Sally Adams
- Donald O'Connor as Kenneth Gibson
- Vera-Ellen as Princess Maria (singing voice was dubbed by Carol Richards)
- George Sanders as General Cosmo Constantine
- Billy De Wolfe as Pemberton Maxwell
- Helmut Dantine as Prince Hugo
- Walter Slezak as August Tantinnin
- Steven Geray as Prime Minister Sebastian
- Ludwig Stössel as Grand Duke Otto (as Ludwig Stossel)
- Lilia Skala as Grand Duchess Sophie
- Charles Dingle as Sen. Brockway
- Emory Parnell as Sen. Charlie
- Percy Helton as Sen. Wilkins

== Production ==
O'Connor later said the film contained his best dancing.

We did some beautiful numbers. The one with the castle all broken down, and around the water, was beautiful music beautifully choreographed. Working with Vera Ellen was such a joy. And there’s one they cut out [when the movie is shown] on television. It had everything: a very fast two-person number, tap dancing. If you see the picture in its entirety, you’ll see it. That was, for me, my best dancing.

== Reception ==
Contemporary reviews were mostly positive. Bosley Crowther of The New York Times called the film "an admirable duplication of the show as presented on the stage. And in it, the wonderful Miss Merman is better than ever—in spades!" Variety praised the film as a "literate musical" with Merman "at her robust best with a tune," though "in a few spots the editing could have been tighter." Harrison's Reports called it "as entertaining a musical comedy as has been seen on the screen in many seasons." John McCarten of The New Yorker was mostly favorable, writing: "There is no point at this late date in commenting on any performance of Miss Merman's. On this occasion, as usual, her voice is as big as all outdoors, her manner confidently low-down, and her sense of comedy remarkable. I'm not so sure, though, that the book of 'Call Me Madam' is varied enough to harness all her energy." Orval Hopkins of The Washington Post wrote: "This is one you ought to see. There may have been better musicals, with better dancing, better books and better songs (there are a couple of Irving Berlin scores that beat this one, in my opinion). But they didn't have Ethel Merman." The Monthly Film Bulletin called the film "a disappointment," writing that Berlin's tunes were "not among his best" and that Merman "lacks variety. Probably she was better on the stage, for her fairly inflexible theatrical technique emphasizes, in a film, her limitations."

== Awards and nominations ==
Award	Category	Nominee(s)	Result
Academy Awards	Best Costume Design – Color	Irene Sharaff	Nominated
Academy Awards	Best Scoring of a Musical Picture	Alfred Newman	Won
Cannes Film Festival	Grand Prix	Walter Lang	Nominated
Directors Guild of America Awards	Outstanding Directorial Achievement in Motion Pictures	Walter Lang	Nominated
Golden Globe Awards	Best Actress in a Motion Picture – Musical or Comedy	Ethel Merman	Won
Laurel Awards	Top Male Musical Performance	Donald O'Connor	Won
Writers Guild of America Awards	Best Written American Musical	Arthur Sheekman	Nominated

== Soundtrack ==
All written by Irving Berlin:

- "The Hostess with the Mostess"
- "Lichtenburg"
- "Can You Use Any Money Today"
- "Marrying for Love"
- "It's a Lovely Day Today"
- "That International Rag"
- "You're Just in Love"
- "The Ocarina"
- "What Chance Have I with Love?"
- "Something to Dance About"
- "The Best Thing for You (Would Be Me)"
- "You're Just in Love"
- "Mrs. Sally Adams"
- "You're Just in Love"/"Something to Dance About"

== See also ==
- Perle Mesta, the musical was inspired by the appointment of Mesta as ambassador to Luxembourg.
