= Lewis Cleale =

American theatre actor and singer

Lewis Cleale is an American theatre actor and singer.

== Early life and education ==
A graduate of the University of Miami's Frost School of Music, where he has been named Distinguished Alumnus, and of the Burt Reynolds Dinner Theatre, Cleale's big break came when he was cast in a European tour of Oklahoma!, in which he was noticed by Mary Rodgers, who recommended him for a Los Angeles production of State Fair.

== Career ==
Cleale made his Broadway debut in the 1995 Johnny Burke revue Swinging on a Star, for which he received a Drama Desk Award nomination as Outstanding Featured Actor in a Musical. Additional Broadway credits include the 1996 revival of Once Upon a Mattress with Sarah Jessica Parker, the ill-fated 2002 Michel Legrand musical Amour, and the 2005 hit Spamalot. Cleale also appeared in the popular revue I Love New York which was done at the Rainbows and Stars room along with Bryan Batt, Janet Metz and Heather MacRae. Off-Broadway, he has appeared in Call Me Madam opposite Tyne Daly and A New Brain with Malcolm Gets and Kristin Chenoweth for Lincoln Center Theater.

From September 2008 through March 2009 and from June 2009 through March 2010, Cleale played El Gallo in the Off-Broadway revival of The Fantasticks at the Jerry Orbach Theater on 51st Street and Broadway. Cleale left that show to be an understudy for Sondheim on Sondheim. Cleale credits Sondheim as being one of the reasons he went into acting:

It's Stephen Sondheim and James Lapine, and I moved to New York to work with them. I was a business major in Miami when I took an acting class, and my teacher said 'I don't think you should be a lawyer. I think you should do this [act] with your life.' He gave me the cast album of Into the Woods, and I became obsessed with it. I remember going to my final exam in the spring of '89. It was seven in the morning, and I had a tape deck in my car, and I had this tape playing. It was Robert Westenberg singing, and I got fixated on the lyrics. I'm supposed to be thinking about statistics, and all I could think about was lyrics. So it was, in fact, Stephen Sondheim and James Lapine.

In 2011, Cleale starred in the original Broadway cast of The Book of Mormon, playing roles that included the Mission President, Joseph Smith and others. As of 2025, he remained the longest serving original principal cast member and departed the show on October 26.

In Washington, D.C., Cleale portrayed John Adams in 1776 at Ford's Theatre and Giorgio in Stephen Sondheim's Passion at the Signature Theatre, for which he won the 1997 Helen Hayes Award for "Outstanding Lead Actor in a Resident Musical". In May 2009, he played the lead in the new musical Giant, based on Edna Ferber's novel of the same name, at the Signature Theatre.

Cleale has also performed leading roles at Goodspeed Opera, George Street Playhouse, Cleveland Opera, Actors Theatre of Louisville, Long Beach Civic Light Opera, and The Muny in St. Louis.

=== Tours and recordings ===
In 1999-2000, Cleale portrayed Joe Gillis opposite Petula Clark's Norma Desmond in the national tour of Sunset Boulevard, and in 2002 went on the road again as Lieut. Joe Cable in South Pacific opposite Robert Goulet.

Cleale's recordings include William Finn's Infinite Joy, Adam Guettel's Myths and Hymns, the RCA Victor anthology Great Musicals, and the original cast albums of Once Upon a Mattress, Swinging on a Star, Call Me Madam, and Amour.
