= Songs from "Call Me Madam" =

1950 studio album led by Ethel Merman

Studio album by Ethel Merman, Dick Haymes, Eileen Wilson, Gordon Jenkins' chorus and orchestra
- Released: 1950
- Genre: Show tunes
- Label: Decca

Songs from "Call Me Madam" is a studio album released in 1950 by Decca. The album contained songs from Irving Berlin's recent musical Call Me Madam, and featured a roster led by the star of the musical's original Broadway production, Ethel Merman.

== Release ==
The album originally had eight tracks. That original version was available in the following formats: as a set of four 78-rpm records (cat. no. A-813), a set of four 45-rpm records and as a 10-inch long-play.

After some time, a 12-inch LP version was released that contained 12 tracks and was retitled 12 Songs from "Call Me Madam".

== Background and critical reception ==
Professional ratings
Review scores
| Source | Rating |
|---|---|
| Billboard | 86/100 |

Professional ratings
12 Songs from "Call Me Madam"
Review scores
| Source | Rating |
|---|---|
| AllMusic | 3/5 stars |

Due to her exclusive contractual commitment to Decca, Merman, who was "the focal and vocal point" of the musical, didn't participate in the recording of the Call Me Madam original Broadway cast album (the rights to which had been secured by the rival label RCA Victor) and recorded this album instead. On her version, she is joined by Decca's artists Dick Haymes, Gordon Jenkins, and Eileen Wilson. On the RCA Victor version, Merman's songs are performed by Dinah Shore.

The album was reviewed in the Billboard issue from December 2, 1950, receiving 86 points on a scale of 100, which indicated "excellent" commercial potential. The magazine's reviewer noted: "There's little question that the combination of the success of the show and the buoyant salesmanship of Miss Merman will team to sell a lot of Madam albums for Decca. Still it's not an original cast job and it's not possessed of the show's personality despite the presence of la Merman."

Retrospectively, William Ruhlmann of AllMusic rates the album 3 stars on a scale of 5.

== Track listing ==
=== Album of four records ===
4 × 78-rpm – Decca A-813

Side 1
| No. | Title | Artist(s) | Length |
|---|---|---|---|
| 1. | "The Best Thing for You" | Ethel Merman with Gordon Jenkins and His Orchestra and Chorus |

Side 2
| No. | Title | Artist(s) | Length |
|---|---|---|---|
| 1. | "Marrying for Love" | Ethel Merman with Gordon Jenkins and His Orchestra and Chorus |

Side 3
| No. | Title | Artist(s) | Length |
|---|---|---|---|
| 1. | "You're Just in Love" | Ethel Merman and Dick Haymes with Gordon Jenkins and His Orchestra and Chorus |

Side 4
| No. | Title | Artist(s) | Length |
|---|---|---|---|
| 1. | "Something to Dance About" | Ethel Merman with Gordon Jenkins and His Orchestra and Chorus |

Side 5
| No. | Title | Artist(s) | Length |
|---|---|---|---|
| 1. | "Once Upon a Time Today" | Dick Haymes |

Side 6
| No. | Title | Artist(s) | Length |
|---|---|---|---|
| 1. | "It's a Lovely Day Today" | Dick Haymes and Eileen Wilson |

Side 7
| No. | Title | Artist(s) | Length |
|---|---|---|---|
| 1. | "(Dance to the Music of) The Ocarina" | Gordon Jenkins and His Orchestra and Chorus |

Side 8
| No. | Title | Artist(s) | Length |
|---|---|---|---|
| 1. | "It's a Lovely Day Today" | Gordon Jenkins and His Orchestra |
| 2. | "You're Just in Love" | Gordon Jenkins and His Orchestra |

=== Long-play ===
10-inch LP – Decca DL 5304

Side 1
| No. | Title | Artist(s) | Length |
|---|---|---|---|
| 1. | "The Best Thing for You" | Ethel Merman with Gordon Jenkins and His Orchestra and Chorus |
| 2. | "Marrying for Love" | Ethel Merman with Gordon Jenkins and His Orchestra and Chorus |
| 3. | "It's a Lovely Day Today" | Dick Haymes and Eileen Wilson |
| 4. | "(Dance to the Music of) The Ocarina" | Gordon Jenkins and His Orchestra and Chorus |

Side 2
| No. | Title | Artist(s) | Length |
|---|---|---|---|
| 1. | "You're Just in Love" | Ethel Merman and Dick Haymes with Gordon Jenkins and His Orchestra and Chorus |
| 2. | "Something to Dance About" | Ethel Merman with Gordon Jenkins and His Orchestra and Chorus |
| 3. | "Once Upon a Time Today" | Dick Haymes |
| 4. | "It's a Lovely Day Today" – "You're Just in Love" | Gordon Jenkins and His Orchestra |
