= You're Just in Love =

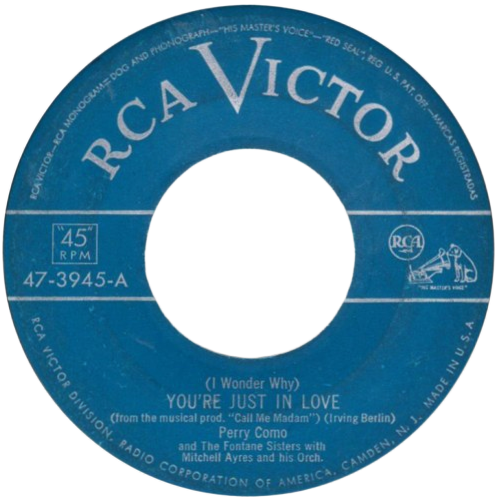

Single by Perry Como and The Fontane Sisters
- B-side: "It's a Lovely Day Today"
- Released: October 23, 1950
- Recorded: Late 1950
- Genre: Pop
- Length: 3:00
- Label: RCA Victor
- Songwriter: Irving Berlin

Perry Como and The Fontane Sisters singles chronology
"A Bushel and a Peck" (1950)	"You're Just in Love" (1950)	"If (They Made Me a King)" (1951)

"You're Just in Love" is a popular song by Irving Berlin. It was published in 1950 and was first performed by Ethel Merman and Russell Nype in Call Me Madam, a musical comedy that made its debut at the Imperial Theatre in New York City on October 12 that year. The show ran for 644 performances. Ethel Merman also later starred in the 1953 film version, with Donald O'Connor.

== Background ==
Musically, the song is one of Irving Berlin's three well-known songs that use true counterpoint—two equal and contrasting melodies running at the same time, both with independent lyrics - his two other best-known counterpoint songs being "Play a Simple Melody" and "An Old-Fashioned Wedding" (see the 1966 revival of Annie Get Your Gun). Berlin also made use of counterpoint in "Pack Up Your Sins (And Go To The Devil)," a song composed for the Music Box Revue of 1922. Berlin's two-melody counterpoint songs (along with some non-Berlin counterpoint songs) are parodied in Rick Besoyan's 1959 musical Little Mary Sunshine. Besoyan has three harmonizing songs sung simultaneously: "Playing Croquet", "Swinging", and "How Do You Do". (The non-Berlin counterpoint songs include Meredith Willson's "Lida Rose" + "Will I Ever Tell You" from Willson's 1957 musical, The Music Man.)

Theatre lore has it that Berlin wrote the song one night after Call Me Madam was not doing well in tryouts. The second act of the show was lacking. "What I'd like to do is a song with the kid (Russell Nype)," Merman said. So, Berlin went to his room and later produced the counterpoint song. When Berlin played the song for Merman, she said, "We'll never get off the stage." Reportedly, Berlin played the song for Russell Nype first, but admonished him not to admit he did so because it would infuriate Merman.

== 1950-51 recordings ==
Several recorded versions made the charts in 1950-51: Perry Como and The Fontane Sisters with Mitchell Ayres' and His Orchestra, Rosemary Clooney and Guy Mitchell, and Ethel Merman and Dick Haymes.

- The Perry Como/Fontane Sisters version was recorded on September 26, 1950, and released by RCA Victor as catalog number 20-3945 (in USA) and by EMI on the His Master's Voice label as catalog number B 10221. The record first reached the Billboard magazine charts on December 22, 1950, and lasted 17 weeks on the chart, peaking at number 5.
- The Rosemary Clooney/Guy Mitchell version was recorded on October 21, 1950, and released by Columbia Records as catalog number 39052. The record first reached the Billboard magazine charts on February 23, 1951, and lasted 2 weeks on the chart, peaking at number 29.
- The Ethel Merman/Dick Haymes version was recorded on October 17, 1950, and released by Decca Records as catalog number 27317. The record first reached the Billboard magazine charts on March 30, 1951, and lasted 1 week on the chart, at number 30. Although the lowest charting of the three, it got a considerable amount of airplay in subsequent years.
- Semprini, on piano with rhythm accompaniment, recorded it in London on January 25, 1951, as the first song of the medley "Dancing to the Piano (No. 12) - Part 2. Hit Medley of Foxtrots from 'Call Me Madam'" along with "The Best Thing for You" and "It's Lovely Day Today". The medley was released by EMI on the His Master's Voice label as catalog number B 10231.

== Other recordings ==
This song was also covered by:

- Sarah Vaughan and Billy Eckstine for their 1957 album Sarah Vaughan and Billy Eckstine Sing the Best of Irving Berlin.
- Chet Atkins for his Chet Atkins at Home album. (1958)
- Jimmy Clanton for his Jimmy's Happy album. (1960)
- Kay Starr for her Movin' On Broadway! album (1960)
- Louis Prima, along with Sam Butera and the Witnesses for his The Wildest Comes Home album. (1962)
- Bing Crosby & Louis Armstrong
- Helen Reddy for her Center Stage album. (1998)
- Ewan McGregor/Jane Horrocks also covered the song in a 2007 released album of further Little Voice songs.

== Popular culture ==
- In the episode of The Muppet Show guest starring Cleo Laine, she sang the song with the Swedish Chef.
- In the 1984 film Aladdin and the Forty Thieves, the song is sung by Peter Duncan, Jonathan Cohen, Keith Chegwin, Mark Curry, Ben Ellison and Geoffrey Russell, as they vie for the heart of the Princess.
- In April 2016, businessperson Carly Fiorina attracted media attention for singing her own lyrics to this tune, during a rally where Republican presidential candidate Ted Cruz announced her as his choice for running mate.
