= The Best Thing for You (Would Be Me) =

1950 song by Irving Berlin

Song
- Published: 1950
- Songwriter: Irving Berlin

"The Best Thing for You (Would Be Me)" is a popular song written by Irving Berlin and published in 1950. It was featured in the 1950 Broadway musical play, Call Me Madam, in which it was introduced by Ethel Merman in a scene with Paul Lukas. The 1953 film version also featured the song when it was sung by Ethel Merman and George Sanders.

== Recorded versions ==
- Bing Crosby - recorded September 21, 1950 and included in the album Bing Crosby Sings the Song Hits from... (1951)
- Perry Como - a single release (1950)
- Doris Day - a single release (1950)
- Margaret Whiting - a single release for Capitol Records (1950)
- Alberto Semprini, on piano with rhythm accompaniment, recorded it in London on January 25, 1952, as the second song of the medley "Part 2. Hit Medley of Foxtrots from 'Call Me Madam'" along with "You're Just in Love" and "It's a Lovely Day Today". The medley was released by EMI on the His Master's Voice label as catalog number B 10231.
- Barbara Lea - A Woman In Love (1955)
- June Christy - included in her album Fair and Warmer! (1957).
- Eddie Fisher - included in his album As Long As There's Music (1958).
- Nat King Cole - Tell Me All About Yourself (1958)
- Art Farmer - Art (1960)
- Bud Powell - Bouncing with Bud (1962), The Complete Bud Powell on Verve (1994)
- Della Reese - Della Reese at Basin Street East (1964)
- Chet Baker -The Best Thing For You (1977), though not released until 1989.
- Rosemary Clooney - included in her album Rosemary Clooney Sings the Music of Irving Berlin (1984).
- Gary Thomas - Till We Have Faces, JMT (1992)
- Moe Koffman - Devil's Brew (1996)
- Stan Getz - The Complete Roost Recordings (1997)
- Bill Charlap - All Through the Night (1998)
- Diana Krall - When I Look in Your Eyes (1999)
