= J. B. Adams =

American actor

J.B. Adams
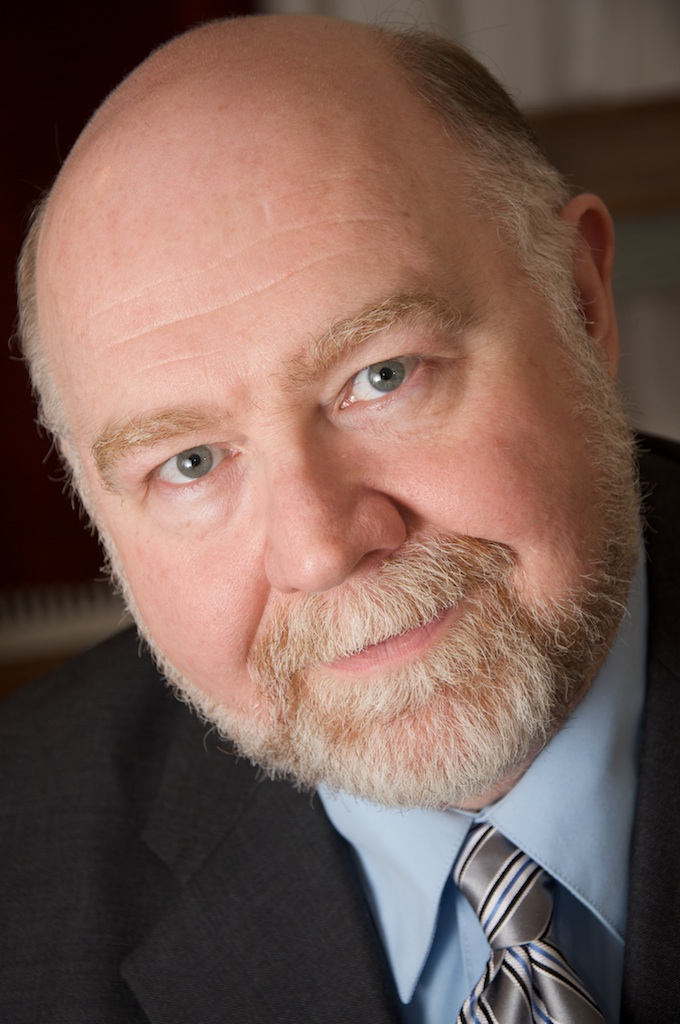
- Born: September 29, 1954 (age 71); Oklahoma City, Oklahoma, U.S.
- Occupation: Actor
- Years active: 1981–present

J.B. Adams (born September 29, 1954) is an American character stage and film actor, director, and singer. He has credits in film, television and, most notably, musical theatre. Originally from Oklahoma City, Oklahoma, he attended Oklahoma City University, where he studied voice, piano, opera, and musical theatre, after which he became a New York City-based Broadway actor. He is perhaps best known for his roles in the Broadway productions of Beauty and the Beast (as Maurice, the father), Annie (as Rooster/Drake/Bert Healy/FDR), Parade (as Luther Rosser), Me and My Girl (as Sir Jasper), Chitty Chitty Bang Bang (as Grandpa Potts), and Elf: The Musical (as Santa). He played the role of Morris Farnsworth in the film Far From Heaven, as well as originating the same role in the Off-Broadway musical adaptation (2013). On TV and the web, he has played Santa for Verizon FiOS and has had guest starring roles on Law & Order: Special Victims Unit and The Michael J. Fox Show.

== Filmography ==
=== Film ===
Year	Title	Role	Notes
1997	I Married a Strange Person!	Keri''s Dad (voice)	
2002	Far from Heaven	Farnsworth	
2016	BearCity 3	Charles	Credited as JB Adams

=== Television ===
Year	Title	Role	Notes
1981	Coward of the County	Self	TV movie
2006	Law & Order: Special Victims Unit	Dr. Richard White	Episode: "Infiltrated"
2013	The Michael J. Fox Show	Chris	Episode: "Christmas"
2019	Friends from College	Charlie's Dad	Episode: "Fireworks"
2020	Max Riddle	B.J.	Episode: "Pilot"

== Broadway ==
- Parade as Luther Rosser
- Beauty and the Beast as Maurice
- Chitty Chitty Bang Bang as Grandpa Potts
- Annie as Drake/Bert Healy
- Me and My Girl as Sir Jasper
- Elf: The Musical as Santa

== Off-Broadway ==
- Far from Heaven as Dr. Bowman
- Balancing Act
