= Galina Talva =

Russian-American ballet dancer and actress

Galina Talva (born Galina Tzvetckoff; 26 Jan 1927–27 Dec 1968) was a Russian-American ballet dancer and actress. She was born in the Bronx to a Russian émigré. She had a sister, Natasha Seeleman (1921-2021).

She appeared in Crime and Punishment on Broadway with John Gielgud. Talva most notably played Princess Maria in Irving Berlin's Call Me Madam, a Broadway musical comedy (1950) starring Ethel Merman, and sang on the original cast recording.

In 1953, she married Leon Volkov, a Soviet Russian Air Force colonel who defected to the USA. They had two children, and she retired. Volkov went on to become Newsweek magazine's Soviet affairs specialist. Leon Volkov died on January 21, 1974.

Talva died of cancer at the National Institutes of Health in Bethesda in 1968.
