= That International Rag =

1913 song by Irving Berlin

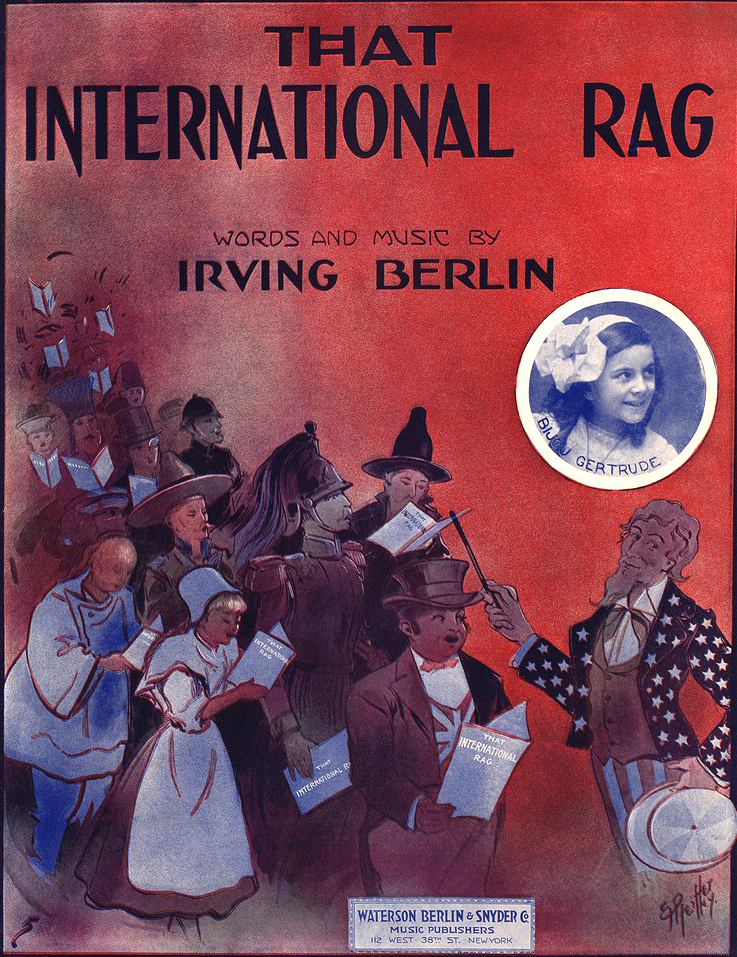
- Cover to the sheet music, first edition

Song
- Released: 1913
- Genre: Pop
- Songwriter: Irving Berlin

Audio sample
- Performed by Billy Murray in 1913 for Edison Records.: file; help

"That International Rag" is a song composed by Irving Berlin in 1913. Berlin wrote the song the night before its debut, when he needed a new opening number for his act while on tour in England.

Days before the song's composition, Berlin held a press conference that backfired and led the public to question his musical talent. He wanted to impress his audience with a new song, so he stayed up overnight to compose the number and completed it just before his matinee in London. The performance was well received; it did well in vaudeville and in early sound recordings. The song later appeared in Hollywood films.

== Background ==
In 1913, Berlin accepted an invitation to cross the Atlantic and perform in London. It was his second trip to England, so he called a press conference shortly after his arrival. This decision would have been normal business practice by Tin Pan Alley standards, but it appeared very brash to the British public. Berlin considered the press conference to be even more important than his scheduled appearance at the Hippodrome; his reputation depended more upon the impression he created for the journalists than on how he performed in a single theater.

Berlin made one mistake at the press conference that led to a backlash in the press and started a rumor that would follow him for decades. After admitting that he could neither read nor write music, he offered to compose a song on the spot to any title the journalists chose. One suggested "The Humming Rag", and he created the tune within an hour. In Berlin's enthusiasm to show off his talent for fast composition, he forgot to consider the impression he created when he tapped out the melody for his musical secretary with a single finger. Soon the public was reading that he was not only illiterate in music, but unable to play the piano. Those envious of his success called him "nothing but a hustling, hard-sell sham". As opening night drew near, he discovered that all of his hit songs were already well known to the British public. Needing a new number to open his act, and he composed "That International Rag" overnight in a panic.

== Composition ==
Berlin stayed up the night before his opening performance to create a new song. He was incapable of composing alone because he was primarily a lyricist who created melodies, so he worked with a musical secretary, Cliff Hess, who transcribed and arranged the piece. As Berlin readily confessed, "I don't know anything about harmony; but I can make tunes".

They made little progress until around four in the morning. When their work began to disturb neighboring guests at the Savoy Hotel, Berlin answered complaints by filling the piano with bathroom towels in order to muffle the sound. He completed the chorus and began writing the second verse around sunrise.

London dropped its dignity
So has France and Germany
All hands are dancing to a raggedy melody
Full of originality

"That International Rag" was completed just in time for its first performance. Berlin later described his method of composition in the following words: "I sweat blood... Absolutely. I sweat blood between 3 and 6 many mornings, and when the drops that fall off my forehead hit the paper they're notes."

Despite the song's title, critics doubt whether the work is actually ragtime. David Blanke explains the distinction between Tin Pan Alley rag and classic rag in the following manner:

The most likely reason for the success of Tin Pan Alley was that it drew upon the well-developed and mature vernacular styles that existed in the United States. The reliance upon ragtime piano pieces is a good case in point. Berlin's Alexander's Ragtime Band and later The International Rag (1913) were ragtime songs but not ragtime music. The difference was not too subtle; ragtime music was formally structured, syncopated and used conventional European harmonies. By contrast, ragtime songs were much looser, intending to give feeling to the music without being tied to its arrangement.

— David Blanke, The 1910s

As critic Gilbert Chase quips, Berlin's Hippodrome billing as "King of Ragtime" during this tour was "not a total misnomer if we add 'white, commercial, synthetic'." A kinder Gary Giddins concludes "it wasn't ragtime, but it was authentic Americana and it did the trick."

== Reception ==
Berlin's performance at the song's debut softened the impression that his initial press conference had given, and it settled some of the doubts about his musical talent.

Berlin's performance at the Hippodrome later that day caught both British audiences and critics by surprise. They had expected heavy, bombastic fare in their own music hall tradition; such was the treatment Berlin's own hits were accorded by English performers. Yet the songwriter's performance was by comparison muted and modest; it did not call to mind skyscrapers, grain elevators, and quick-buck artists. With the imperturbable Cliff Hess accompanying him, Berlin sang 'The International Rag' and all the other hits for which he was known abroad: 'Alexander's Ragtime Band', 'Everybody's Doin' It', and 'When I Lost You'. If his voice was weak, his timing and diction were, as always, impeccable; his sense of conviction was unassailable.

— Laurence Bergreen, As Thousands Cheer: The Life of Irving Berlin

Sophie Tucker introduced the song to vaudeville, and the Victor Military Band saw success with an early recording. In 1938 "That International Rag" appeared as a number in the Twentieth Century Fox film Alexander's Ragtime Band. It was also used in the 1948 MGM film Easter Parade, and in 1953's Call Me Madam.
