= Higher and Higher (musical) =

- Windowcard for original Broadway production
- Music: Richard Rodgers
- Lyrics: Lorenz Hart
- Book: Gladys Hurlbut and Joshua Logan
- Productions: 1940 Broadway

Higher and Higher is a musical comedy with music by Richard Rodgers, lyrics by Lorenz Hart, and book by Gladys Hurlbut and Joshua Logan and produced by Dwight Deere Wiman. It ran on Broadway for 84 performances in 1940.

== Production ==
Higher and Higher premiered on Broadway at the Shubert Theatre on April 4, 1940 and closed on August 24, 1940, after 108 performances. It played a return engagement at the Shubert Theatre from August 5 to August 24, 1940.

It was directed by Joshua Logan, with choreography by Robert Alton, scenic design by Jo Mielziner and costume design by Lucinda Ballard. The cast starred Jack Haley, Marta Eggerth, and Shirley Ross, with Leif Erickson and Lee Dixon and included Vera-Ellen and June Allyson.

A film based on the stage musical was released in 1943, starring Jack Haley.

== Songs ==
Act 1

- "A Barking Baby Never Bites" - Zachary Ash and Sandy Moore
- "From Another World" - Minnie Sorenson, Zachary Ash, Sandy Moore, Hilda O'Brien, Byng and Company
- "Mornings at Seven" - Mike O'Brien, Dottie and Ensemble
- "Nothing But You" - Minnie Sorenson, Patrick O'Toole and Singers
- "Disgustingly Rich" - Zachary Ash, Sandy Moore, Mike O'Brien, Hilda O'Brien, Byng, Miss Whiffen, Dottie and Ensemble

Act 2

- "Blue Monday" - Byng, Nursemaid, Scullery Maid, Ladies' Maid and Ensemble
- "Ev'ry Sunday Afternoon" - Minnie Sorenson and Patrick O'Toole
- "A Lovely Day for a Murder" - Mike O'Brien, Dottie and Ensemble
- "How's Your Health" - Zachary Ash, Minnie Sorenson and Patrick O'Toole
- "It Never Entered My Mind" - Sandy Moore
- "I'm Afraid" - Zachary Ash, Sandy Moore and Specialty Girls and Boys
- "I'm Afraid (Reprise)" - Sandy Moore, Ellen, Mike O'Brien, Byng, Hilda O'Brien, First Cop and Company
- "Finale" - Company
