= Carol Richards =

American actress

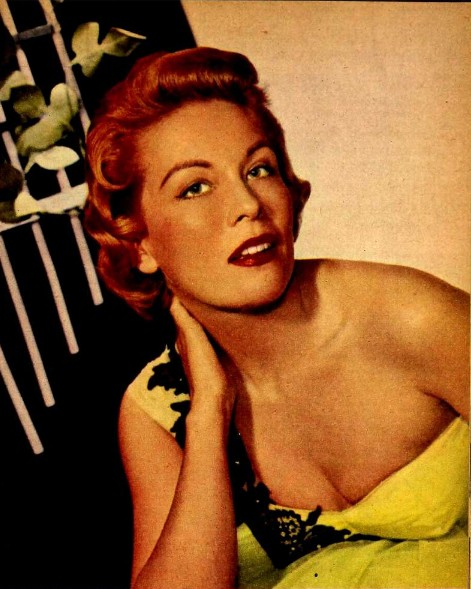
- Carol Richards (as pictured in TV Radio Mirror September 1956)
- Born: Carol June Vosburgh; June 6, 1922; Harvard, Illinois, U.S.
- Died: March 16, 2007 (aged 84); Vero Beach, Florida, U.S.
- Other names: Carol Richards; Carole Richards; Carol Lutzhoff
- Spouse(s): Bayard Lutzhoff (1938-1948); Carl Altman (1950-1952); Andrew Mitran (1957-1961); Howard Kamin (1963-1967); Edward Swiedler (1967-2007)
- Children: 5

Carol Swiedler (stage name Carol Richards or Carole Richards) (June 6, 1922 – March 16, 2007) was an American singer and radio and television performer, best remembered for her duet with Bing Crosby on the hit single "Silver Bells" and for "Sunshine Cake."

== Early years ==
The daughter of George and Martha Vosburgh, Richards was born Carol June Vosburgh in Harvard, Illinois. She had three siblings. Her father worked for the Northwestern Railroad. She began performing at age 4, but within a couple of years her mother thought she was acting "like a diva" and wouldn't let her take the stage again until she was 11.

== Radio ==
Richards worked as an actress at a radio station in Indianapolis, Indiana, until she had to sing in one of her roles. "The station offered me a job as a vocalist, and I took it," she said. "And I've been singing ever since."

== Television ==
At the start of her career in her early 20s, Richards won a Bob Hope talent contest, moved to Hollywood, and appeared on numerous TV shows including I Love Lucy, Name That Tune, The Saturday Night Revue, and variety shows hosted by Dennis Day, Edgar Bergen, and Ezio Pinza.

Richards was a regular cast member on The Pinky Lee Show (April 5, 1950 - November 9, 1950), both singing and playing Lee's girlfriend; on The Ralph Edwards Show (January 14, 1952 - May 16, 1952), and on The Bob Crosby Show (1953–1957).

== Film ==
In the film The Petty Girl (1950), Richards supplied the singing voices for both Joan Caulfield and Movita Castaneda. She also was the voice double for Vera-Ellen in Call Me Madam (1953); for Cyd Charisse in Brigadoon (1954), Deep in My Heart (1954), It's Always Fair Weather (1955), and Silk Stockings (1957); and for Betta St. John in The Robe (1953).

== Recording ==
In 1949 Richards signed a contract with Decca Records. Her first recording on that label (Decca 24680) featured "I Wish I Had a Wishbone". She was accompanied by Sonny Burke and his orchestra. A review in the trade publication Billboard commented, "New Decca thrush makes a satisfactory debut with an infectious little rhythm ditty." In 1950 Richards and Bing Crosby recorded "Sunshine Cake" (Decca 24846). They were accompanied by Victor Young's orchestra and Jeff Alexander's chorus.

Richards' voice was featured on the soundtrack recording from The Robe (1953). Decca's release of that album resulted in a $400,000 legal suit by Richards against Decca Records and M.C.A. Artists. The suit charged that she recorded the song for use in the film and did not authorize any other use of it.

In 1956 Richards recorded Intrigue (Victor 6562) for RCA Victor. The song was the theme from the film Foreign Intrigue (1956).

== Personal appearances ==
Richards worked frequently with Danny Kaye, Jerry Lewis, and Bob Hope and sang with the Russ Morgan and Desi Arnaz Bands. In December 1951 Richards accompanied ventriloquist Edgar Bergen and accordionist Domenick Frontiere on a 10-day tour of 14 military hospitals in the United States. Dubbed "Operation Santa Claus", the tour also distributed 10,000 pounds of gifts that people across the country had donated to patients in the hospitals. A 1955 newspaper article about Richards reported, "She's drawn a big hand as featured attraction at Ciro's, The Shamrock Hotel, and other swank night spots."

In the 1960s after moving to Chicago, Richards performed numerous club dates and appeared frequently on Don McNeill's radio show, The Breakfast Club.

== Later years ==
Richards gave up her music career after marrying Edward Swiedler. She then continued as an artist, completing numerous sculptures, pastels, and oil paintings, as well as publishing a book, Letters from the Cosmos, with her husband.

== Personal life ==
Richards' first marriage to Bayard Lutzhoff occurred at age 16 (5 weeks before she turned 17 in 1938). She took the stage name Richards in honor of her favorite nephew. Her marriage to Lutzhoff ended in divorce in 1948. In 1950 she married Carl Altman; that marriage also ended in divorce in 1952. During a 1957 tour in Chicago she met and married dentist Andrew Mitran. They had two children. Mitran died of a brain tumor in 1961. In 1962 Carol married Howard Kamin. They had one child and moved to Boston. The couple were divorced in 1967. She then married Edward Swiedler. The Swiedlers were married for 40 years until her death. Richards had 5 children, 19 grandchildren, and 8 great-grandchildren.

== Death ==
On March 16, 2007, Richards died of kidney failure at the Indian River Memorial Hospital in Vero Beach, Florida, at the age of 84.
