= Vera-Ellen =

American actress, singer and dancer (1921–1981)

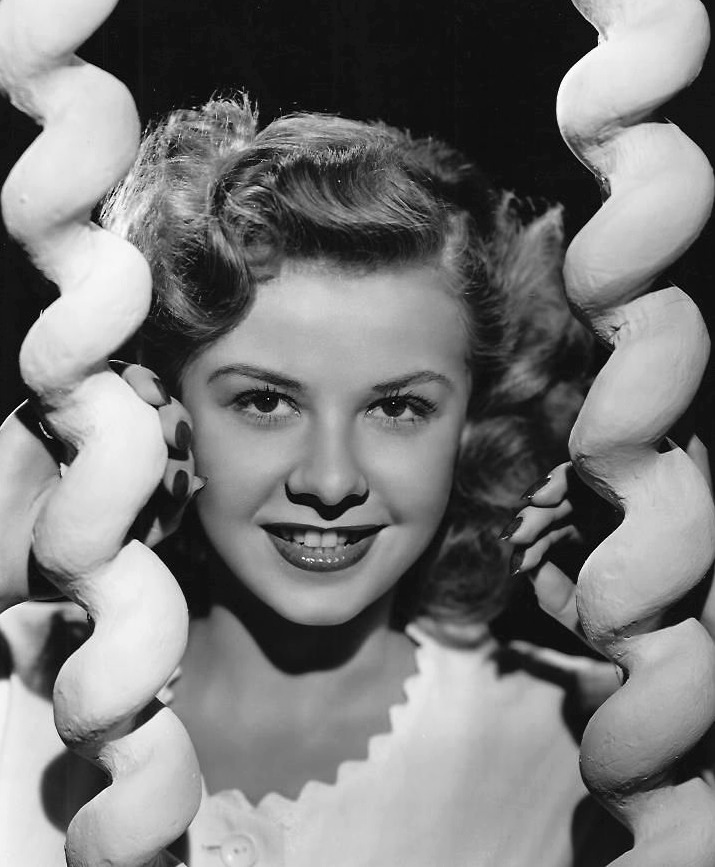
- Vera-Ellen in 1941
- Born: Vera-Ellen Rohe; February 16, 1921; Norwood, Ohio, U.S.
- Died: August 30, 1981 (aged 60); Los Angeles, California, U.S.
- Resting place: Glen Haven Memorial Park, Sylmar, California
- Occupations: Dancer; actress; singer
- Years active: 1937–1959
- Spouses: Robert Hightower (m. 1941; div. 1946) Victor Rothschild (m. 1954; div. 1966)
- Children: 1

Vera-Ellen (born Vera-Ellen Rohe; February 16, 1921 (Note: Per Soren, Vera-Ellen: The Magic And The Mystery, 2003, p. 15: "Though her birth date is usually given as February 16, 1926, Vera-Ellen was actually born on February 16, 1921. When she went to Hollywood at 23, she and her mother decided to shave five years off her age to make her appear a precocious teenage sensation. During her days of Hollywood stardom she always would tell close friends, 'My age depends on whoever is talking to me at the time.'") – August 30, 1981) was an American dancer, actress, and singer. She is known for her solo performances as well as her work with Fred Astaire, Gene Kelly, Danny Kaye, and Donald O'Connor. She is known for her roles in On the Town (1949) with Kelly and White Christmas (1954) with Kaye.

== Early life ==
Vera-Ellen Rohe was born in Norwood, Ohio, to Martin F. Rohe, a piano dealer, and Alma C. Westmeier. Both were descended from German immigrants. Her mother dreamed she would have a girl named Vera-Ellen, including the hyphen.

She began ballet dancing at age 10 and quickly became proficient. One of her fellow dance students at Hessler Studio of Dancing was Doris Day. At age 13, she was a winner on the Major Bowes Amateur Hour and embarked upon a professional career.

== Career ==
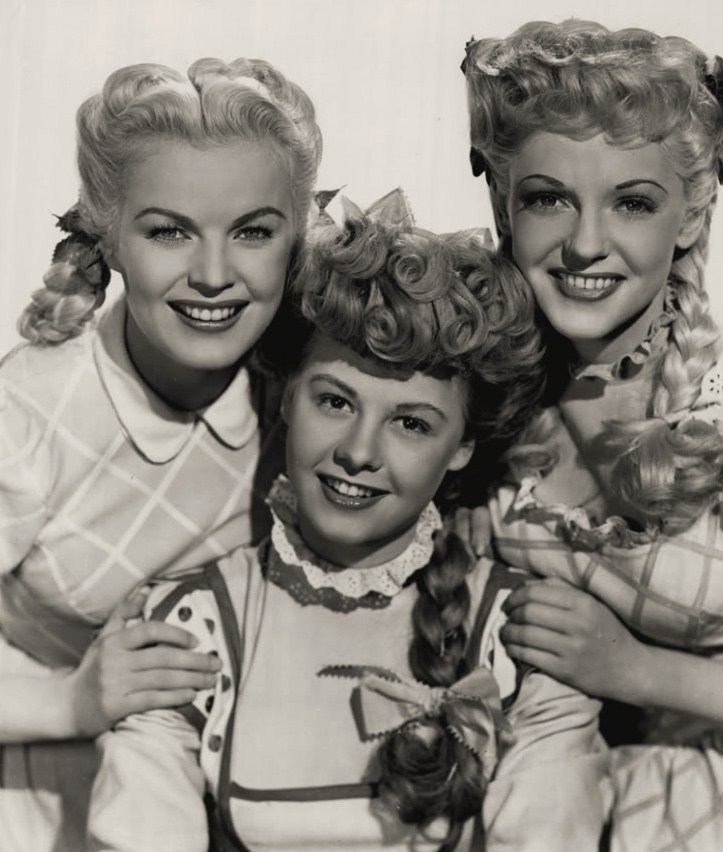
Left to right: June Haver, Vera-Ellen, and Vivian Blaine in Three Little Girls in Blue (1946)

=== Stage ===
In 1939, she made her Broadway debut in the Jerome Kern/Oscar Hammerstein musical Very Warm for May. She became one of the youngest Rockettes at Radio City Music Hall. This led to roles on Broadway in Panama Hattie, By Jupiter, and A Connecticut Yankee, where she was spotted by Samuel Goldwyn, who cast her opposite Danny Kaye and Virginia Mayo in the 1945 film Wonder Man.

=== Dubbing ===
Starting in 1945 with Wonder Man, her first film, her singing was dubbed. However, the Decca Broadway Original Cast Album of 1943's revival of A Connecticut Yankee has two vocals by Vera-Ellen, "I Feel at Home with You" and "You Always Love the Same Girl," both duets with Chester Stratton. Her style is of a comic soubrette.

=== Film ===
She danced with Gene Kelly in the Hollywood musicals Words and Music and On the Town, while also appearing in the last Marx Brothers film, Love Happy. She received top billing alongside Fred Astaire in the musicals Three Little Words and The Belle of New York. She had a co-starring role with Donald O'Connor in the Ethel Merman vehicle Call Me Madam. She also starred in the 1951 musical comedy Happy Go Lovely alongside David Niven and Cesar Romero. Vera-Ellen's penultimate film role was the 1954 blockbuster hit White Christmas, co-starring with Bing Crosby, Danny Kaye, and Rosemary Clooney. She starred in only one more film, the 1957 British production Let's Be Happy.

=== Television ===
Vera-Ellen was a frequent guest on US variety programming in the mid-to-late 1950s. Her final performances were on a November 22, 1958, television episode of The Perry Como Show and a February 14, 1959, broadcast of The Dinah Shore Show. Following that, Vera-Ellen retired from performing.

== Personal life ==
According to Hollywood chronicler Brian Cronin, what he describes as Vera-Ellen's "extremely thin" appearance led to rumors during her career that she had an eating disorder. A rumor that her neck was always covered during the filming of White Christmas because of wrinkling caused by supposed anorexia persists to this day. However, pictures and video taken at the same time show her neck appearing normal and undamaged. A friend, Bill Dennington, who knew her during the last 20 years of her life, dismissed the story about her neck and added that he hated "that people think of her as 'the dancer with anorexia' and not just the fabulous dancer who has been so overlooked."

Her niece by marriage, Ileana Rothschild, born in 1967, remembered that her aunt "never stopped taking dance classes and maintained her slim figure always." She was also an "avid swimmer", who used a swimming program to recover from a mild stroke late in her life. According to Rothschild, she had no eating disorder.

Vera-Ellen was married twice. Her first husband was a fellow dancer, Robert Hightower, to whom she was married from February 1941 to November 1946. Her second husband was oilman Victor Bennett Rothschild. They were married from 1954 to 1966 when they divorced. While married to Rothschild, she gave birth to a daughter, Victoria Ellen, who died in 1963 at three months from SIDS. Following the death of her only child, she withdrew from public life.

== Death ==
Vera-Ellen died at the Los Angeles County General Hospital on August 30, 1981, of ovarian cancer, aged 60.

== Filmography ==
Year	Title	Role	Notes
1945	Wonder Man	Midge Mallon	Singing voice dubbed by June Hutton
1946	The Kid from Brooklyn	Susie Sullivan	Singing voice dubbed by Suzanne Ellers
1946	Three Little Girls in Blue	Myra Charters	Singing voice dubbed by Carol Stewart
1947	Carnival in Costa Rica	Luisa Molina	Singing voice dubbed by Pat Friday
1948	Words and Music	Herself	
1949	Love Happy	Maggie Phillips	
1949	On the Town	Ivy Smith	
1950	Three Little Words	Jessie Brown	Singing voice dubbed by Anita Ellis
1951	Happy Go Lovely	Janet Jones	Singing voice dubbed by Eve Boswell
1952	The Belle of New York	Angela Bonfils	Singing voice dubbed by Anita Ellis
1953	Call Me Madam	Princess Maria	Singing voice dubbed by Carol Richards
1953	Big Leaguer	Christy	
1954	White Christmas	Judy Haynes	Singing voice dubbed by Trudy Stevens
1957	Let's Be Happy	Jeannie MacLean	Singing voice dubbed by Joan Small (final film role)

== Stage work ==
- Very Warm for May (1939)
- Higher and Higher (1940)
- Panama Hattie (1940)
- By Jupiter (1942)
- A Connecticut Yankee (1943)

== Radio appearances ==
Year	Program	Episode/source
1953	Stars over Hollywood	Hasty Retreat

== See also ==
- List of dancers
