= Russell Nype =

American actor and singer

- Nype in 1954
- Born: Russell Harold Nype; April 26, 1920; Zion, Illinois, U.S.
- Died: May 27, 2018 (aged 98); West Palm Beach, Florida, U.S.
- Education: Lake Forest College
- Occupations: Actor; singer
- Years active: 1949–1991
- Spouse: Diantha Fitch Lawrence (m. 1953; died 2015)
- Children: 1

Russell Harold Nype (April 26, 1920 – May 27, 2018) was an American actor and singer.

== Early years ==
Born in Zion, Illinois, Nype majored in speech and English at Lake Forest College, earning a bachelor's degree. During World War II, he served in the United States Army. Early in his New York career, press stories frequently mentioned his Illinois roots and religiously strict upbringing: "I come from the severest aspects of the Midwestern Bible belt. My family hasn't actually written me off because I'm in show business, but they'd be much happier if I concentrated my performances on singing hymns in church. My answer is that I couldn't support my wife and children."

== Career ==
After teaching ballroom dance and singing in nightclubs, Nype made his Broadway debut in Marc Blitzstein's opera Regina in 1949. The following year he won critical acclaim and both the Tony and Theatre World Awards for his performance opposite Ethel Merman in Call Me Madam. One Broadway columnist provided a measure of how quickly he rose from obscurity in the show: "A week ago, Russell Nype was such an unknown that Celebrity Service, which keeps files on performers, didn't even list his name. The day after he opened in Call Me Madam Celeb Service received 60 phone calls from agents, writers, and producers asking for background material on him, and his phone number. He gets featured billing in the show next week." Merman and Nype were reunited in 1970 when, late in the run of the original production of Hello, Dolly!, Merman joined the show in the title role and Nype was cast as Cornelius Hackl. Nype later appeared in revivals of Carousel, Brigadoon, and Morning's at Seven, and opposite Elaine Stritch in the short-lived musical Goldilocks, for which he won his second Tony. A Bucks County (PA) Playhouse engagement in 1960 was a revival of the 1935 play Petticoat Fever, with added new songs.

Nype caught Hollywood's attention early and was offered a role in MGM's Young Man in a Hurry. MGM released him after eight days of filming, and the movie eventually debuted with Glenn Ford as Young Man with Ideas in 1952. As Nype explained, "I realized from the outset that I was too young for the role. It was originally written for Jimmy Stewart and the character was supposed to be married 10 years and have three children--eight, five, and one years old....When the studio bosses saw the first eight days' rushes, they agreed with me that I was too young for the part."

Nype's feature film credits include Love Story (1970), Can't Stop the Music (1980) and The Stuff (1985). On television he appeared in Studio One, Fantasy Island, One Day at a Time, The Cosby Show, Murder, She Wrote, Who's the Boss?, and productions of One Touch of Venus, Kiss Me, Kate and Morning's at Seven.

== Personal life ==
Nype married Diantha Fitch Lawrence on March 7, 1953; the couple had one child, a son. Diantha Lawrence Nype died in 2015.

== Death ==
Nype died in West Palm Beach, Florida, on May 27, 2018, at the age of 98, survived by his son, two grandchildren, and two stepchildren.

== Filmography ==
Film
Year	Title	Role	Notes
1970	Love Story	Dean Thompson	
1980	Can't Stop the Music	Richard Montgomery	
1983	Balboa	Senator Highsmith	
1985	The Stuff	Richards	

== Stage ==
Year	Title	Role(s)	Venue	Ref.
1949	Regina	Leo Hubbard	46th Street Theatre, Broadway	
1950	Great to Be Alive!	Freddie, singer	Winter Garden Theatre, Broadway	
1950	Call Me Madam	Kenneth Gibson	Imperial Theatre, Broadway	
1952	Call Me Madam	Kenneth Gibson	National Theatre, Washington, D.C.	
1952	One Touch of Venus	Rodney Hatch	Pitt Stadium, Pittsburgh	
1956	Wake Up, Darling	Deerfield Prescott	Ethel Barrymore Theatre, Broadway	
1957	Carousel	Enoch Snow	New York City Center	
1958	Goldilocks	George Randolph Brown	Lunt-Fontanne Theatre, Broadway	
1963	Brigadoon	Jeff Douglas	New York City Center	
1963	Once for the Asking	Alex Crumbull	Booth Theatre, Broadway	
1965	The Owl and the Pussycat	F. Sherman	North American tour	
1967	The Girl in the Freudian Slip	Dr. Alec Rice	Booth Theatre, Broadway	
1968	Private Lives	Elyot Chase	Theatre de Lys, Off-Broadway	
1970	Hello, Dolly!	Cornelius Hackl	St. James Theater, Broadway	
1971	Light Up the Sky	Tyler Rayburn	Meridian Hall, Toronto	
1971	Light Up the Sky	Tyler Rayburn	Fisher Theatre, Detroit	
1972	Lady Audley's Secret	Robert Audley	Eastside Playhouse, Off-Broadway	
1980	Morning's at Seven	David Crampton (replacement)	Lyceum Theatre, Broadway	
1981	Light Up the Sky	Tyler Rayburn	John Drew Theater-Guild Hall, Long Island	
1983	Tallulah	Will Bankhead	Westside Arts Center, Off-Broadway	
1985	Taking My Turn	John	US national tour	
1986	Painting Churches	Gardner Church	Long Island Stage	

== Awards and nominations ==
Year	Award	Category	Nominated work	Results	Ref.
1951	Theatre World Awards	—N/a	Call Me Madam	Won	
1951	Tony Awards	Best Supporting or Featured Actor in a Musical	Call Me Madam	Won	
1959	Tony Awards	Best Supporting or Featured Actor in a Musical	Goldilocks	Won (Note: Tied with Leonard Stone for Redhead)	
