= Rosemary Clooney discography =

List of musical works by Rosemary Clooney

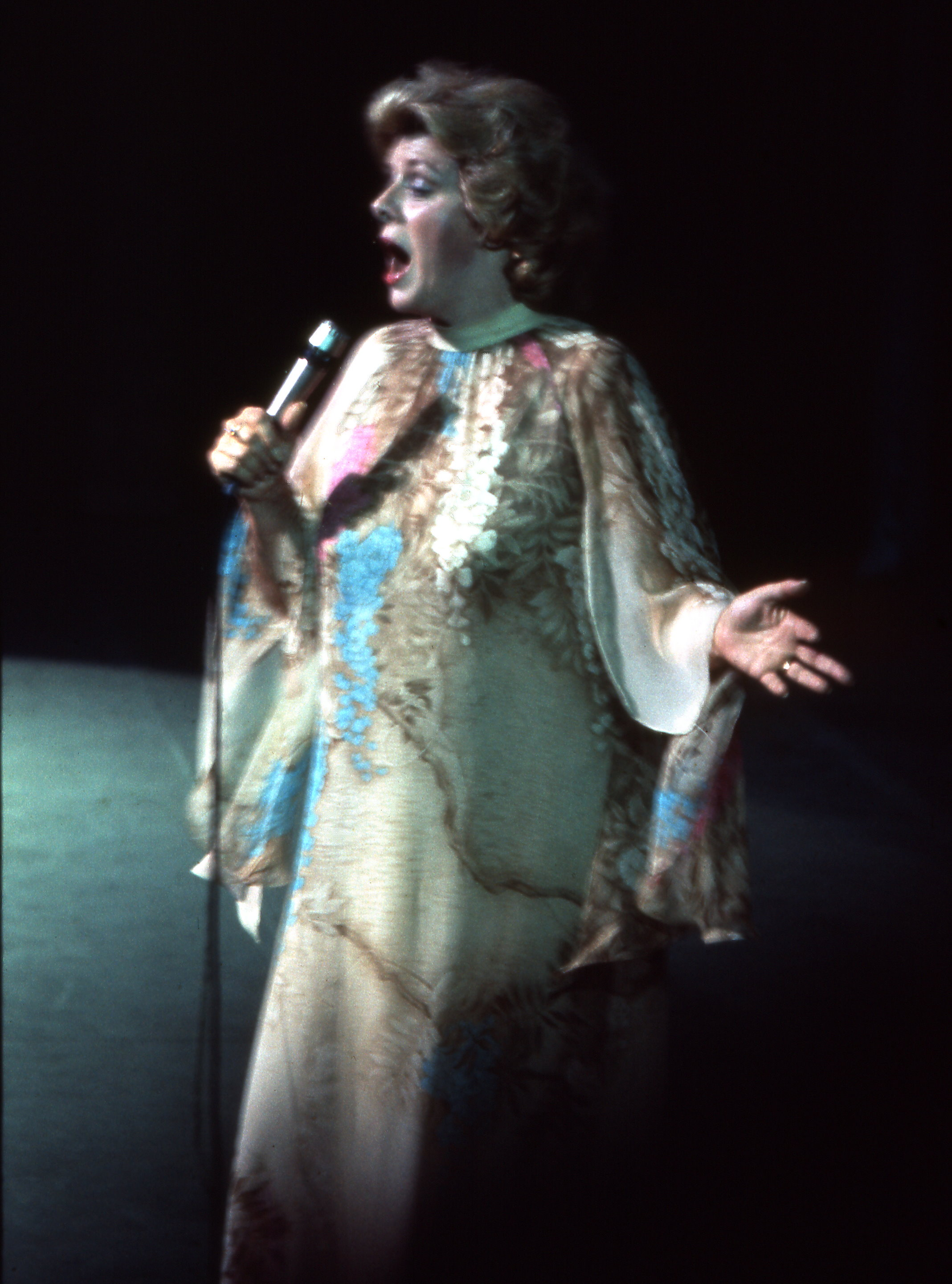
- Rosemary Clooney onstage, 1977
- Studio albums: 49
- Soundtrack albums: 1
- Live albums: 6
- Compilation albums: 33
- Promotional singles: 16
- Video albums: 4
- Box sets: 3
- Lead artist singles: 59
- Collaborative and featured singles: 31
- Other charted songs: 7

The discography of American singer Rosemary Clooney contains 49 studio albums, 33 compilation albums, six live albums, four video albums, one soundtrack album, three box sets, 59 singles as a lead artist, 33 singles as a collaborative or featured artist, 16 promotional singles and seven other charted songs. Clooney's first singles were issued with Tony Pastor and their fourth collaboration together ("You Started Something"), reached number 16 on the US Billboard pop chart in 1948. The Clooney-Pastor collaboration continued through 1949 and resulted in three more US charting singles. Clooney's first solo single to chart was 1951's "Beautiful Brown Eyes", which reached the top 20 in the US and number nine in Australia. It was followed by "Come On-a My House", her first number one US single, along with reaching the Australian top ten. In 1952, "Half as Much" topped the US and Australian charts, while "Botch-a-Me" reached the top five in both countries.

From 1951–52, Clooney collaborated on singles with Guy Mitchell, Marlene Dietrich and Gene Autry. Her highest-charting was a top ten Autry collaboration titled "The Nightmare Before Christmas Song". She later joined The Benny Goodman trio for the 1955 US top 20 song, "Memories of You". Clooney's 1954 single, "Hey There", topped the US and Australian charts. Its B-side, "This Ole House", also topped the US chart, along with becoming her first to reach number one in the United Kingdom. Its follow-up, "Mambo Italiano", also placed at number one in the UK, while also peaking in the US and Australian top ten. Clooney's final top ten single was 1957's "Mangos", but various labels continued issuing singles through 1976. Among them was her final US pop-charting single ("Many a Wonderful Moment") and her only US adult contemporary-peaking single ("One Less Bell to Answer").

Clooney's first studio albums were released by Columbia Records, beginning with 1952's Hollywood's Best (with Harry James) and was followed by 1954's Irving Berlin's White Christmas. The label also issued her first live album titled Rosemary Clooney on Stage (1956). Clooney then collaborated with Benny Goodman on A Date with the King (1956) and Duke Ellington on Blue Rose (1956). Four studio LP's were issued with MGM Records, starting with 1958's Oh Captain! with José Ferrer. Through RCA Victor, Clooney joined Bing Crosby on Fancy Meeting You Here (1958) and later with Pérez Prado on A Touch of Tabasco (1960). Three more RCA studio LP's were issued through 1963. A pair of albums were released with the Reprise label, followed by her second collaboration with Crosby titled That Travelin' Two-Beat (1965).

No material was released by Clooney until 1976's Look My Way by United Artists. Beginning in 1977, Concord Records released Clooney's studio albums and continued doing so for than 20 years. Her first Concord LP was 1977's Everything's Coming Up Rosie and the label would issue a total of 24 studio albums by Clooney. Among her 1980s albums were With Love (1981), Rosemary Clooney Sings Ballads (1985) and Show Tunes (1989). Her 1992 album, Girl Singer, was her first to make the US Traditional Jazz Albums chart while 1995's Demi-Centennial was her first to enter the US Top Jazz Albums chart. The 1996 studio album, White Christmas was her first to make the US Billboard 200 and to reach the number one spot on the Traditional Jazz chart. Clooney's last studio album was 2001's Sentimental Journey: The Girl Singer and Her New Big Band.

== Albums ==
=== Studio albums ===
List of studio albums, with selected chart positions, showing other details
Title	Album details	Peak chart positions		
Title	Album details	US	US Jazz	US Trad Jazz
Hollywood's Best (with Harry James)	Released: October 1952; Label: Columbia; Formats: LP	3	—	—
Irving Berlin's White Christmas	Released: 1954; Label: Columbia; Formats: LP	—	—	—
While We're Young	Released: 1954; Label: Columbia; Formats: LP	—	—	—
Children's Favorites	Released: 1955; Label: Columbia; Formats: LP	—	—	—
A Date with the King (with Benny Goodman)	Released: 1956; Label: Columbia; Formats: LP	—	—	—
Blue Rose (with Duke Ellington and His Orchestra)	Released: May 1956; Label: Columbia; Formats: LP	—	—	—
Ring Around Rosie (with The Hi-Lo's)	Released: 1957; Label: Columbia; Formats: LP	—	—	—
Oh, Captain! (with José Ferrer)	Released: 1958; Label: MGM; Formats: LP	—	—	—
The Ferrers at Home	Released: 1958; Label: MGM; Formats: LP	—	—	—
Fancy Meeting You Here (with Bing Crosby)	Released: 1958; Label: RCA Victor; Formats: LP	—	—	—
Hymns from the Heart	Released: 1959; Label: MGM; Formats: LP	—	—	—
How the West Was Won (credited with Bing Crosby and various artists)	Released: 1959; Label: RCA Victor; Formats: LP	—	—	—
Rosie Swings Softly	Released: 1960; Label: MGM; Formats: LP	—	—	—
Swing Around Rosie (with the Buddy Cole Trio)	Released: 1959; Label: Coral; Formats: LP	—	—	—
A Touch of Tabasco (with Pérez Prado)	Released: 1959; Label: RCA Victor; Formats: LP	—	—	—
Clap Hands! Here Comes Rosie!	Released: 1960; Label: RCA Victor; Formats: LP	—	—	—
Rosie Solves the Swingin' Riddle!	Released: 1961; Label: RCA Victor; Formats: LP	—	—	—
Rosemary Clooney Sings Country Hits from the Heart	Released: 1963; Label: RCA Victor; Formats: LP	—	—	—
Love	Released: 1963; Label: Reprise; Formats: LP	—	—	—
Thanks for Nothing	Released: 1964; Label: Reprise; Formats: LP	—	—	—
That Travelin' Two-Beat (with Bing Crosby)	Released: 1965; Label: Capitol; Formats: LP	—	—	—
Look My Way	Released: 1976; Label: United Artists; Formats: LP	—	—	—
Nice to Be Around	Released: 1977; Label: United Artists; Formats: LP	—	—	—
Everything's Coming Up Rosie	Released: 1977; Label: Concord; Formats: LP	—	—	—
Rosie Sings Bing	Released: 1978; Label: Concord; Formats: LP	—	—	—
Christmas with Rosemary Clooney	Released: 1978; Label: Mistletoe; Formats: LP, cassette	—	—	—
Here's to My Lady	Released: 1979; Label: Concord; Formats: LP	—	—	—
Rosemary Clooney Sings the Lyrics of Ira Gershwin	Released: 1979; Label: Concord; Formats: LP, cassette	—	—	—
With Love	Released: 1981; Label: Concord; Formats: LP, cassette	—	—	—
Rosemary Clooney Sings the Music of Cole Porter	Released: 1982; Label: Concord; Formats: LP, cassette	—	—	—
Rosemary Clooney Sings the Music of Harold Arlen	Released: 1983; Label: Concord; Formats: LP, cassette	—	—	—
My Buddy (with Woody Herman)	Released: 1983; Label: Concord; Formats: LP, cassette	—	—	—
Rosemary Clooney Sings the Music of Irving Berlin	Released: 1984; Label: Concord; Formats: LP, CD, cassette	—	—	—
Rosemary Clooney Sings Ballads	Released: 1985; Label: Concord; Formats: LP, CD, cassette	—	—	—
Rosemary Clooney Sings the Music of Jimmy Van Heusen	Released: 1986; Label: Concord; Formats: LP, CD	—	—	—
Rosemary Clooney Sings the Lyrics of Johnny Mercer	Released: August 1987; Label: Concord; Formats: LP, CD	—	—	—
Show Tunes	Released: 1989; Label: Concord; Formats: LP, CD	—	—	—
Rosemary Clooney Sings Rodgers, Hart & Hammerstein	Released: 1990; Label: Concord; Formats: CD	—	—	—
For the Duration	Released: 1991; Label: Concord; Formats: CD	—	—	—
Girl Singer	Released: 1992; Label: Concord; Formats: CD	—	—	22
Do You Miss New York?	Released: 1993; Label: Concord; Formats: CD	—	—	—
Still on the Road	Released: 1994; Label: Concord; Formats: CD	—	—	18
Demi-Centennial	Released: 1995; Label: Concord; Formats: CD	—	27	10
Dedicated to Nelson	Released: 1996; Label: Concord; Formats: CD	—	10	5
White Christmas	Released: October 15, 1996; Label: Concord; Formats: CD	186	—	1
Mothers & Daughters	Released: April 22, 1997; Label: Concord; Formats: CD	—	3	1
At Long Last (with the Count Basie Orchestra)	Released: October 13, 1998; Label: Concord; Formats: CD	—	—	20
Brazil (with John Pizzarelli)	Released: June 6, 2000; Label: Concord; Formats: CD	—	15	5
Sentimental Journey: The Girl Singer and Her New Big Band	Released: August 14, 2001; Label: Concord; Formats: CD	—	—	6
"—" denotes a recording that did not chart or was not released in that territory.

=== Compilation albums ===
List of compilation albums, with selected chart positions, showing other details
Title	Album details	Peak chart positions	
Title	Album details	US Jazz	US Trad Jazz
Tenderly	Released: 1955; Label: Columbia; Formats: LP	—	—
Clooney Tunes	Released: 1957; Label: Columbia; Formats: LP	—	—
Rosie's Greatest Hits	Released: 1958; Label: Columbia; Formats: LP	—	—
In High Fidelity	Released: 1958; Label: Harmony; Formats: LP	—	—
Young at Heart	Released: 1959; Label: Harmony; Formats: LP	—	—
Four Great Ladies of Song (with Dinah Shore, Jo Stafford and Doris Day)	Released: 1975; Label: Columbia House; Formats: LP	—	—
Greatest Hits	Released: 1976; Label: CBS; Formats: LP	—	—
The Rosemary Clooney Songbook	Released: 1982; Label: CBS; Formats: LP	—	—
The Best of Rosemary Clooney	Released: 1986; Label: CBS; Formats: Cassette	—	—
Legendary Singers	Released: 1988; Label: Time Life; Formats: LP, CD	—	—
Her Legendary Recordings	Released: 1989; Label: CBS; Formats: LP	—	—
16 Most Requested Songs	Released: 1991; Label: BMG/Columbia/Legacy; Formats: CD	—	—
Tenderly	Released: 1992; Label: Sony; Formats: LP	—	—
The Essence of Rosemary Clooney	Released: June 1, 1993; Label: Columbia/Legacy; Formats: CD	—	—
You Started Something (with Tony Pastor)	Released: March 1, 1996; Label: Sony; Formats: CD	—	—
Best of Rosemary Clooney	Released: August 20, 1996; Label: Columbia/Sony; Formats: CD	—	—
Greatest Songs	Released: 1996; Label: Curb; Formats: CD, cassette	—	—
Songs from White Christmas (& Other Yuletide Favorites)	Released: October 7, 1997; Label: BMG/Legacy; Formats: CD	—	—
70: A Seventieth Birthday Celebration	Released: May 19, 1998; Label: Concord; Formats: CD, cassette	24	11
16 Biggest Hits	Released: July 18, 2000; Label: Columbia/Legacy; Formats: CD	—	—
Beautiful Ballads	Released: January 1, 2001; Label: Sony; Formats: CD	—	—
The Classic Rosemary Clooney	Released: July 18, 2001; Label: RCA; Formats: CD	—	—
The Girl Singer	Released: May 21, 2002; Label: Bluebird/RCA; Formats: CD	—	—
Greatest Hits	Released: August 13, 2002; Label: RCA/Sony; Formats: CD	—	—
Jazz Singer	Released: June 24, 2003; Label: Columbia/Legacy; Formats: CD	—	—
A Merry Little Christmas	Released: September 9, 2003; Label: Legacy; Formats: CD	—	—
Love Songs	Released: January 13, 2004; Label: Columbia/Legacy; Formats: CD	48	23
The Rosemary Clooney Show: Songs from the Classic Television Show	Released: March 23, 2004; Label: Concord/Universal; Formats: CD	—	17
The Essential Rosemary Clooney	Released: August 31, 2004; Label: Columbia/Legacy; Formats: CD	—	—
Making Whoopee: The Love Songs of Rosemary Clooney	Released: May 24, 2005; Label: BMG; Formats: CD	—	—
Come on-a My House: The Very Best of Rosemary Clooney	Released: August 1, 2006; Label: Bluebird/Legacy; Formats: CD	—	—
The Reprise Years	Released: September 4, 2006; Label: Rhino; Formats: CD	—	—
Playlist: The Very Best of Rosemary Clooney	Released: October 8, 2011; Label: BMG/Sony; Formats: CD	—	—
"—" denotes a recording that did not chart or was not released in that territory.

=== Live albums ===
List of live albums, with selected chart positions, showing other details
Title	Album details	Peak chart positions	
Title	Album details	US Jazz	US Trad Jazz
Rosemary Clooney on Stage	Released: 1956; Label: Columbia; Formats: LP	—	—
Aurex Jazz Festival '83 Live (with Les Brown & His Band of Renown)	Released: 1983; Label: Eastworld; Formats: LP, CD	—	—
Sweetest Sounds (with the Les Brown Orchestra)	Released: 1983; Label: Artistic Records; Formats: LP	—	—
50th Anniversary Concert at the London Palladium (Bing Crosby with special guest Rosemary Clooney)	Released: 1997; Label: EMI/Music for Pleasure; Formats: CD	—	—
The Last Concert	Released: November 19, 2002; Label: Concord; Formats: CD	32	10
The Crosby-Clooney Radio Sessions	Released: January 1, 2013; Label: Collectors' Choice/Primary Wave; Formats: CD, Digital	—	—
"—" denotes a recording that did not chart or was not released in that territory.

=== Soundtrack albums ===
List of soundtrack albums, showing all relevant details
Title	Album details
Red Garters (with Guy Mitchell and Joanne Gilbert)	Released: 1954; Label: Columbia; Formats: LP

=== Video albums ===
List of video albums, showing all relevant details
Title	Album details
Singing at Her Best	Released: March 9, 2004; Label: Passport; Formats: DVD
The Rosemary Clooney Show: Songs from the Classic Television Show	Released: July 13, 2004; Label: Concord; Formats: DVD
In Concert Series	Released: 2004; Label: Passport; Formats: DVD
Great Women Singers of the 20th Century: Rosemary Clooney	Released: April 25, 2006; Label: Kultur; Formats: DVD

== Box sets ==
List of box sets, showing all relevant details
Title	Album details
Come on-a My House	Released: 1997; Label: Bear Family; Formats: CD
Memories of You	Released: September 16, 1998; Label: Bear Family; Formats: CD
Many a Wonderful Moment	Released: July 12, 2000; Label: Bear Family; Formats: CD

== Extended Plays ==
Title	Album details
Rosie and Marlene.	Released: 1953; Label: Columbia Records; Format: LP

== Singles ==
=== As lead artist ===
List of lead singles, with selected chart positions, showing other relevant details
Title	Year	Peak chart positions					Album
Title	Year	US	US AC	AUS	CAN	UK	Album
"Cabaret"	1949	—	—	—	—	—	non-album singles
"The Kid's a Dreamer"	1950	—	—	—	—	—	non-album singles
"A Good Time Was Had by All"	1950	—	—	—	—	—	non-album singles
"(Remember Me) I'm the One Who Loves You"	1950	—	—	—	—	—	non-album singles
"C-H-R-I-S-T-M-A-S"	1950	—	—	—	—	—	non-album singles
"Beautiful Brown Eyes"	1951	11	—	9	—	—	non-album singles
"Mixed Emotions"	1951	22	—	—	—	—	non-album singles
"Come On-a My House"	1951	1	—	8	—	—	non-album singles
"I'm Waiting Just for You"	1951	21	—	—	—	—	non-album singles
"I Wish I Wuz"	1951	27	—	—	—	—	non-album singles
"Find Me"	1951	—	—	—	—	—	non-album singles
"Be My Life's Companion"	1951	18	—	6	—	—	non-album singles
"Tenderly"	1952	17	—	18	—	—	non-album singles
"Half as Much"	1952	1	—	1	—	3	non-album singles
"Botch-a-Me"	1952	2	—	3	—	—	non-album singles
"Blues in the Night"	1952	17	—	—	—	—	non-album singles
"If I Had a Penny"	1952	26	—	—	—	—	non-album singles
"Little Red Riding Hood's Christmas Tree"	1952	—	—	—	—	—	non-album singles
"What Would You Do (If You Were in My Place)"	1953	—	—	—	—	—	non-album singles
"Haven't Got a Worry"	1953	—	—	—	—	—	non-album singles
"When I See You"	1953	—	—	—	—	—	non-album singles
"Cheekan Choonem (I Haven't Got It)"	1953	—	—	—	—	—	non-album singles
"Shoo, Turkey, Shoo"	1953	—	—	—	—	—	non-album singles
"Happy Christmas Little Friend"	1953	30	—	—	—	—	non-album singles
"My Baby Rocks Me"	1953	—	—	—	—	—	non-album singles
"Brave Man"	1954	—	—	—	—	—	Red Garters
"Hey There"	1954	1	—	1	—	4	non-album singles
"Mambo Italiano"	1954	10	—	10	—	1	non-album singles
"Count Your Blessings Instead of Sheep"	1954	27	—	—	—	—	Irving Berlin's White Christmas
"Where Will the Dimple Be?"	1955	—	—	4	—	6	non-album singles
"Love Among the Young"	1955	—	—	—	—	—	non-album singles
"Sailor Boys Have to Talk to Me in English"	1955	—	—	21	—	—	non-album singles
"Go on By"	1955	—	—	10	—	—	non-album singles
"Pet Me Poppa"	1955	62	—	—	—	—	non-album singles
"The Key to My Heart"	1955	82	—	—	—	—	non-album singles
"I Could Have Danced All Night"	1956	49	—	—	—	—	non-album singles
"Hello, Young Lovers"	1956	—	—	—	—	—	While We're Young
"Come Rain or Come Shine"	1956	—	—	—	—	—	non-album singles
"(Don't That Take The) Rag Offen the Bush"	1956	—	—	—	—	—	non-album singles
"Mangos"	1957	10	—	32	42	17	non-album singles
"Sing, Little Birdie, Sing"	1957	—	—	—	—	—	non-album singles
"(You Can't Lose the Blues With) Colors"	1957	—	—	—	—	—	non-album singles
"Tonight"	1957	—	—	—	—	—	non-album singles
"You Don't Know Him"	1958	—	—	—	—	—	non-album singles
"Morning Music Of Montmartre"	1958	—	—	—	—	—	Oh, Captain!
"It's a Boy"	1958	—	—	89	—	—	non-album single
"For You"	1959	—	—	—	—	—	Rosie Swings Softly
"Many a Wonderful Moment"	1960	84	—	—	—	—	non-album singles
"Danke Schoen"	1960	—	—	—	—	—	non-album singles
"Hey, Look Me Over"	1960	—	—	—	—	—	non-album singles
"Theme from 'Return to Peyton Place"	1961	—	—	—	—	—	non-album singles
"Give Myself a Party"	1961	— (Note: "Give Myself a Party" did not enter the Hot 100, but peaked at number eight on Bubbling Under Hot 100 Singles, which acts as a 25-song extension of the Hot 100.)	—	71	—	—	Rosemary Clooney Sings; Country Hits from the Heart
"I Will Follow You (Chariot)"	1963	—	—	—	—	—	non-album singles
"Prisoner's Song"	1963	—	—	—	—	—	non-album singles
"Hello Faithless"	1963	—	—	—	—	—	Thanks for Nothing
"Stay Awake"	1964	—	—	—	—	—	non-album singles
"I Need a Broken Heart (Like a Hole in My Head)"	1966	—	—	—	—	—	non-album singles
"One Less Bell to Answer"	1968	—	34	—	—	—	non-album singles
"When You Got Love"	1976	—	—	—	—	—	Look My Way
"—" denotes a recording that did not chart or was not released in that territory.

=== As a collaborative and featured artist ===
List of collaborative and featured singles, with selected chart positions, showing other relevant details
Title	Year	Peak chart positions			Album
Title	Year	US	AUS	UK	Album
"I'm Sorry I Didn't Say I'm Sorry" (Tony Pastor and His Orchestra with Rosemary Clooney)	1947	—	—	—	non-album singles
"At a Sidewalk Penny Arcade" (Tony Pastor and His Orchestra with Rosemary Clooney)	1948	—	—	—	non-album singles
"A Boy from Texas – A Girl from Tennessee" (Tony Pastor and His Orchestra with Betty and Rosemary Clooney)	1948	—	—	—	non-album singles
"You Started Something" (Tony Pastor and His Orchestra with Rosemary Clooney)	1948	16	—	—	non-album singles
"Grieving for You" (Tony Pastor and His Orchestra with Rosemary Clooney)	1949	11	—	—	non-album singles
"When You're in Love" (Tony Pastor and His Orchestra with Rosemary Clooney)	1949	—	—	—	non-album singles
"'A' You're Adorable" (Tony Pastor and His Orchestra with Rosemary and Betty Clooney)	1949	12	—	—	non-album singles
"It's Like Taking Candy from a Baby" (Tony Pastor and His Orchestra with Rosemary Clooney)	1949	21	—	—	non-album singles
"On an Ordinary Morning" (with Johnny Thompson)	1950	—	—	—	non-album singles
"Love Means Love" (with Frank Sinatra)	1951	—	—	—	non-album singles
"You're Just in Love" (with Guy Mitchell)	1951	24	—	—	non-album singles
"The House of Singing Bamboo" (with Guy Mitchell)	1951	—	3	—	non-album singles
"Too Old to Cut Mustard" (with Marlene Dietrich)	1952	12	17	—	non-album singles
"You'll Never Know" (with Harry James)	1952	18	—	—	Hollywood's Best
"The Night Before Christmas Song" (with Gene Autry)	1952	9	—	—	non-album singles
"Withered Roses" (with George Morgan)	1953	—	—	—	non-album singles
"It's the Same" (with Marlene Dietrich)	1953	—	—	—	non-album singles
"Dennis the Menace" (with Jimmy Boyd)	1953	23	20	—	non-album singles
"Man (Uh Huh)" (with José Ferrer)	1953	—	15	7	non-album singles
"Sisters" (with Betty Clooney)	1954	30	—	—	Irving Berlin's White Christmas
"Mr. and Mrs." (with José Ferrer)	1954	—	—	—	non-album singles
"Open Up Your Heart (And Let the Sunshine In)" (with Little Sister Gale Clooney)	1955	—	—	—	non-album singles
"When You Wish Upon a Star" (with Harry James)	1955	—	—	—	Hollywood's Best
"Memories of You" (The Benny Goodman Trio with Rosemary Clooney)	1955	20	10	—	Date with the King
"Goodbye" (The Benny Goodman Sextet with Rosemary Clooney)	1956	—	—	—	Date with the King
"Grievin'" (with Duke Ellington and His Orchestra)	1956	—	—	—	Blue Rose
"You Are My Sunshine" (with Carl Smith, The Collins Kids, Gene Autry and Don Cherry)	1956	—	—	—	non-album singles
"He'll Be Comin' Down the Chimney" (as Rosemary Clooney with Her Sister Gail)	1956	—	—	—	non-album singles
"Flattery" (with José Ferrer)	1959	—	—	—	non-album singles
"Ain't A-Hankerin" (with Bob Hope)	1959	—	—	—	non-album singles
"On a Slow Boat to China" (with Bing Crosby)	1959	—	—	—	Fancy Meeting You Here
"—" denotes a recording that did not chart or was not released in that territory.

=== Promotional singles ===
List of promotional singles, showing all relevant details
Title	Year	Album	Ref.
"Dandy, Handy and Candy"	1951	non-album singles	
"Fuzzy Wuzzy (Wuz a Bear)"	1951	non-album singles	
"Eggbert, the Easter Egg"	1951	non-album singles	
"Me and My Teddy Bear"	1951	non-album singles	
"Punky Punkin the Happy Pumpkin"	1951	non-album singles	
"Little Red Monkey"	1953	non-album singles	
"White Christmas"	1954	Irvin Berlin's White Christmas	
"The Lady Is a Tramp"	1954	Tenderly	
"Let's Give a Christmas Present to Santa Claus"	1954	non-album singles	
"Peter Cottontail"	1955	non-album singles	
"Baby, The Ball Is Over (Live On The Ed Sullivan Show)"	2021	non-album singles	
"Oh Danny Boy/Londonderry Air/Dear Old Donegal (Medley/Live On The Ed Sullivan Show)" (with Maureen O'Hara, Pat Rooney, Sr. and Ed Sullivan)	2022	non-album singles	
"For You (Live On The Ed Sullivan Show)"	2023	non-album singles	
"Hey There / This Ole House (Rerecorded version)"	2024	non-album singles	
"Come on-a My House / Half as Much (Rerecorded Version)"	2024	non-album singles	
"Botch-a-Me / Hey There (Rerecorded Version)"	2024	non-album singles	

== Other charted songs ==
List of songs, with selected chart positions, showing other relevant details
Title	Year	Peak chart positions			Album	Notes
Title	Year	US	AUS	UK	Album	Notes
"Shot Gun Boogie"	1951	—	13	—	non-album singles	(Note: B-side to "Beautiful Brown Eyes".)
"If Teardrops Were Pennies"	1951	24	—	—	non-album singles	(Note: B-side to "I'm Waiting Just for You".)
"The Place Where I Worship" (with Guy Mitchell)	1951	—	6	—	non-album singles	(Note: B-side to "The House of Singing Bamboo".)
"Good for Nothin'" (with Marlene Dietrich)	1952	—	19	—	non-album singles	(Note: B-side to "Too Old to Cut Mustard".)
"The Continental (You Kiss While Dancing)" (with Harry James)	1952	—	10	—	non-album singles	(Note: B-side to "You'll Never Know".)
"This Ole House"	1954	1	8	1	non-album singles	(Note: B-side to "Hey There".)
"I've Grown Accustomed to Your Face"	1956	70	—	—	non-album singles	(Note: B-side to "I Could Have Danced All Night".)
"—" denotes a recording that did not chart or was not released in that territory.
