= Rosie Sings Bing =

Studio album by Rosemary Clooney
- Released: 1978
- Recorded: January 6, 1978
- Genre: Vocal jazz
- Length: 51:10
- Label: Concord
- Producer: Carl Jefferson

Rosemary Clooney chronology
Everything's Coming Up Rosie (1977)	Rosie Sings Bing (1978)	Here's to My Lady (1978)

Professional ratings
Review scores
Source	Rating
Allmusic	3/5 stars
DownBeat	4/5 stars

Rosie Sings Bing is a 1978 studio album by the American jazz singer Rosemary Clooney, recorded in tribute to Bing Crosby, who had died the previous year. The album was the second Clooney made for Concord Records.

Clooney and Crosby recorded two albums of duets, Fancy Meeting You Here (1958) and That Travelin' Two-Beat (1965), and Clooney accompanied Crosby at his 1977 performances at the London Palladium shortly before Crosby died.

Clooney recorded her tribute to Crosby with a quintet of jazz musicians that included saxophonist Scott Hamilton, Cal Collins, Nat Pierce, Monty Budwig, and Jake Hanna. All but Collins had appeared on her previous Concord album. Drummer Jake Hanna had also performed with Bing live on stage in Norway on 27 August 1977.

The liner notes for this album were written by Bing's widow, Kathryn Crosby.

== Track listing ==
1. "But Beautiful" (Johnny Burke, Jimmy Van Heusen) – 4:04
2. "Pennies from Heaven" (Burke, Arthur Johnston) – 4:20
3. "Blue Skies" (Irving Berlin) – 3:22
4. "I Surrender Dear" (Harry Barris, Gordon Clifford) – 4:10
5. "Where the Blue of the Night (Meets the Gold of the Day)" (Fred E. Ahlert, Bing Crosby, Roy Turk) – 4:29
6. "It's Easy to Remember (And So Hard to Forget)" (Lorenz Hart, Richard Rodgers) – 4:50
7. "Swinging on a Star" (Burke, Van Heusen) – 3:05
8. "Just One More Chance" (Sam Coslow, Johnston) – 5:01
9. "I Wished on the Moon" (Dorothy Parker, Ralph Rainger) – 4:20
10. "Too-Ra-Loo-Ra-Loo-Ral (That's an Irish Lullaby)" (James Royce Shannon) – 1:50

== Personnel ==
=== Performance ===
- Rosemary Clooney – vocal
- Cal Collins – guitar
- Scott Hamilton – tenor saxophone
- Nat Pierce – piano
- Monty Budwig – double bass
- Jake Hanna – drums
