= Red Garters =

Red Garters may refer to:

- Red Garters (film), a 1954 musical starring Rosemary Clooney
  - Red Garters (album), a soundtrack album from the film
  - "Red Garters" (song), the title song from the film and album, popularized by Rosemary Clooney

== See also ==
- Red Garter Casino, a hotel and casino in Nevada, U.S.
