= A Tribute to Duke =

Studio album by Various artists
- Released: 1977
- Recorded: 1977
- Genres: Jazz, Vocal jazz
- Length: 35:28
- Label: Concord
- Producer: Carl Jefferson

Various artists chronology
Nice to Be Around (1977)	A Tribute to Duke (1977)	Everything's Coming Up Rosie (1977)

A Tribute to Duke is a 1977 studio album by various artists, recorded in homage to bandleader and composer Duke Ellington.

== Reception ==
The Allmusic review by JT Griffith awarded the album 3 stars stating:

This short, nine-track tribute to the legendary Duke Ellington packs more swing into its 36-minute length than you'd expect. The disc features guest performances from Bing Crosby, Rosemary Clooney, Tony Bennett, and Woody Herman...The instrumental "Main Stem" is a rollicking number that sadly fades out after five minutes. Crosby's "Don't Get Around Much Anymore" features some of his more adventurous vocalizations... A Tribute to Duke plays like a wonderful appetizer, readying your palette for more music. The only weakness of this disc is that it is too short.".

Although he was to still record in the U.K., this marked the last occasion that Bing Crosby recorded in America.

Professional ratings
Review scores
Source	Rating
Allmusic	3/5 stars

== Track listing ==
All music is composed by Duke Ellington.

No.	Title	Lyrics	Performer	Length
1.	"Don't Get Around Much Anymore"	Bob Russell	Bing Crosby	3:13
2.	"Main Stem"	̶	Scott Hamilton	5:15
3.	"In a Sentimental Mood"	Manny Kurtz, Irving Mills	Woody Herman	3:56
4.	"I'm Checkin' Out, Go'om Bye"	Billy Strayhorn	Rosemary Clooney	3:47
5.	"Prelude to a Kiss"	Mack Gordon, Irving Mills	Tony Bennett	2:31
6.	"It Don't Mean a Thing (If It Ain't Got That Swing)"	Irving Mills	Scott Hamilton	4:54
7.	"I'm Just a Lucky So-and-So"	Mack David	Tony Bennett	2:11
8.	"What Am I Here For?"	Frankie Laine	Scott Hamilton	5:03
9.	"Sophisticated Lady"	Mitchell Parish	Rosemary Clooney	4:38

== Personnel ==
The backing musicians for all performers are the following:

- Bill Berry – trumpet
- Nat Pierce – piano
- Monty Budwig – double bass
- Jake Hanna – drums
