= Irving Berlin's White Christmas =

Studio album by Rosemary Clooney
- Released: 1954
- Genre: Traditional pop
- Label: Columbia

Rosemary Clooney chronology
Rosie and Marlene (1953)	Irving Berlin's White Christmas (1954)	While We're Young (1954)

Irving Berlin's White Christmas was an LP album of songs by Rosemary Clooney from the movie White Christmas, released by Columbia Records in 1954 (CL 6338). The album was also released as a set of four 78-rpm records at the same time.

This was one of two albums of songs from the movie, neither of which qualifies as an original soundtrack recording, because Bing Crosby (who had a recording contract with Decca Records) and Rosemary Clooney (with a Columbia contract) could not record together. This album, therefore, was issued by Columbia, while Decca issued an album called Selections from Irving Berlin's White Christmas.

Clooney and Crosby subsequently both signed with RCA Victor Records, and the two made some albums together for RCA. [See Fancy Meeting You Here (1958), How the West Was Won, (1959), and Rendezvous (1969).] They also both signed with Capitol Records and made albums together for that company. [See, for example, That Travelin' Two-Beat.]

This album has since been digitally remastered and released on compact disc and as a digital download on music sites such as Spotify and Qobuz.

It received a four-star rating from AllMusic.

== Track listing ==
All songs are written by Irving Berlin from the film.

Track number	Title
1	"White Christmas"
2	"Mandy"
3	"Snow"
4	"Gee, I Wish I Was Back In The Army"
5	"Love, You Didn't Do Right By Me"
6	"Sisters" (duet with Betty Clooney)
7	"The Best Things Happen While You're Dancing"
8	"Count Your Blessings Instead Of Sheep"

Musical directors: Percy Faith, Paul Weston, and Buddy Cole.

The album was reissued, combined with the 1954 Rosemary Clooney album Red Garters, in compact disc format, by Collectables Records on June 12, 2001.
