= This Can't Be Love (song) =

Song
- Published: 1938
- Composer: Richard Rodgers
- Lyricist: Lorenz Hart

"This Can't Be Love" is a show tune and a popular song from the 1938 Rodgers and Hart musical The Boys from Syracuse when it was sung by Eddie Albert and Marcy Westcott. The lyrics poke fun at the common depiction of love in popular songs as a host of malignant symptoms, saying, "This can't be love because I feel so well."

The song was a hit for the orchestras of Horace Heidt (vocal by Larry Cotton) and Benny Goodman (vocal by Martha Tilton) in late 1938 and early 1939.

== Covers ==
- Margaret Whiting - a single release for Capitol Records released in 1949
- Bing Crosby recorded the song in 1954 for use on his radio show and it was subsequently included in the box set The Bing Crosby CBS Radio Recordings (1954-56) issued by Mosaic Records (catalog MD7-245) in 2009
- Dinah Washington - for her album For Those in Love (1955)
- Nat "King" Cole - included in his album Nat King Cole Sings for Two in Love (1955)
- Ella Fitzgerald on her two-record Verve release Ella Fitzgerald Sings the Rodgers and Hart Songbook (1956)
- Sonny Stitt - on his album Kaleidoscope (1957)
- Connee Boswell for her album Connee (1956)
- Rosemary Clooney - included in her album Swing Around Rosie (1958)
- Charlie Rouse and Paul Quinichette for their album The chase is on (1958)
- Red Garland - It's a Blue World (1958)
- Ben Webster & Oscar Peterson - Ben Webster Meets Oscar Peterson (Verve, 1959)
- Johnny Smith - for his album The Sound of The Johnny Smith Guitar (1961)
- Judy Garland performed the song as a medley with "Almost Like Being in Love" in the Judy at Carnegie Hall concert (1961)
- Doris Day - included in the album Billy Rose's Jumbo (1962)
- Sarah Vaughan - included in her album Sweet 'n' Sassy (1963)
- Michel Legrand - included in the album Michel Legrand Big Band Plays Richard Rodgers (1963)
- Nelson Riddle - included in the album Nelson Riddle – Interprets Great Music Great Films Great Sounds (1964)
- Julie London - included in the album Easy Does It (1968)
- Tony Bennett - for his album The Rodgers and Hart Songbook (1973)
- Chet Atkins and Lenny Breau - for their album Standard Brands (1981)
- George Shearing - included in the album Getting in the Swing of Things (1981)
- Natalie Cole - in her album Unforgettable... with Love (1991)
- Diana Krall for her album Stepping Out (1993)
- Stacey Kent - for her album In Love Again: The Music of Richard Rodgers (2002)
- Johnny Mathis - for his album Isn't It Romantic: The Standards Album (2005)
- Rufus Wainwright - included in the live album Rufus Does Judy at Carnegie Hall (2007)
- Frank Sinatra - included in the compilation album Classic Sinatra II (2009)

== Film appearances ==
- 1940 The Boys from Syracuse
- 1948 Words and Music - danced by Cyd Charisse and Dee Turnell with ballerinas. The music was interpolated with On Your Toes
- 1962 Billy Rose's Jumbo - sung by Doris Day. However, most of the songs in this film come from the 1935 Rodgers & Hart musical Jumbo.
- 2016 Café Society - performed by Conal Fowkes
