= Seduction: Sinatra Sings of Love =

Compilation album by Frank Sinatra
- Released: January 27, 2009
- Recorded: 1960–1984
- Genre: Traditional pop, vocal jazz, swing
- Length: 82:03
- Label: Reprise

Frank Sinatra chronology
| Frank Sinatra: The Greatest Concerts (2008) | Seduction: Sinatra Sings of Love (2009) | Live at the Meadowlands (2009) |

Professional ratings
Review scores
| Source | Rating |
|---|---|
| Allmusic | 3.5/5 stars |

Seduction: Sinatra Sings of Love is a 2009 double disc compilation album by American singer Frank Sinatra.

== Track listing ==
=== Disc one ===
1. "Prisoner of Love" (Russ Columbo, Leo Robin, Clarance Gaskill) - 3:50
2. "I've Got You Under My Skin" (Cole Porter) - 3:26
3. "My Funny Valentine" [Alternate Version] (Richard Rodgers, Lorenz Hart) - 2:31
4. "Witchcraft" (Cy Coleman, Carolyn Leigh) - 2:37
5. "All the Way" (Sammy Cahn, Jimmy Van Heusen) - 3:32
6. "It Had to Be You" (Isham Jones, Gus Kahn) - 3:53
7. "Young at Heart" (Leigh, Johnny Richards) - 2:56
8. "Love Is a Many-Splendored Thing" (Paul Francis Webster, Sammy Fain) - 3:54
9. "Some Enchanted Evening" (Rodgers, Oscar Hammerstein II) - 3:29
10. "(How Little It Matters) How Little We Know" (Leigh, Phil Springer) - 2:23
11. "I Get a Kick Out of You" (Porter) - 3:13
12. "The Second Time Around" (Cahn, Van Heusen) - 3:09
13. "At Long Last Love" (Porter) - 2:41
14. "I Concentrate on You" (Porter) - 2:39
15. "Then Suddenly Love" (Ray Alfred, Paul Vance) - 2:23
16. "They Can't Take That Away from Me" (George Gershwin, Ira Gershwin) - 2:42
17. "A Fine Romance" (Dorothy Fields, Jerome Kern) - 2:13
18. "More (Theme from Mondo Cane)" (Riz Ortolani, Nino Oliviero, Marcello Ciorciolini, Norman Newell) - 3:01
19. "This Happy Madness (Estrada Branca)" (Aloysio de Oliveira, Antonio Carlos Jobim, Gene Lees) - 3:02
20. "Teach Me Tonight" (Cahn, Gene DePaul) - 3:48
21. "All the Way Home" (Teddy Randazzo) - 3:54
22. "That's All" (Bob Haymes, Alan Brandt) - 3:21

=== Disc two ===
1. "The Look of Love" (Cahn, Van Heusen) - 2:44
2. "Secret Love" (Webster, Fain) - 3:54
3. "I Wish You Love" (Léo Chauliac, Charles Trenet, Albert Beach) - 2:56
4. "I Like to Lead When I Dance" (Cahn, Van Heusen) - 3:09
5. "Misty" (Erroll Garner, Johnny Burke) - 2:41
6. "Stay With Me (Main Theme from The Cardinal)" (Leigh, Jerome Moross) - 3:04
7. "Talk To Me Baby" (Robert E. Dolan, Johnny Mercer) - 2:58
8. "For Once in My Life" (Ron Miller, Orlando Murden) - 2:50
9. "All of You" (Porter) - 1:42
10. "I Had the Craziest Dream" (Mack Gordon, Harry Warren) - 3:13
