= Live at the Meadowlands =

Live album by Frank Sinatra
- Released: May 5, 2009
- Recorded: March 14, 1986
- Genre: Jazz
- Length: 50:15
- Label: Concord
- Producer: Charles Pignone

Frank Sinatra chronology
Seduction: Sinatra Sings of Love (2009)	Live at the Meadowlands (2009)	Classic Sinatra II (2009)

Professional ratings
Review scores
Source	Rating
Allmusic	3/5 stars

Live at the Meadowlands is a 2009 live album by the American singer Frank Sinatra, of a 1986 concert at the Meadowlands Arena in East Rutherford, New Jersey.

Housed in a package and presented with a 24-page collectors' book of rare photos and extensive notes by long-time Sinatra associate Hank Cattaneo, this previously unreleased recording features 21 digitally remastered songs on one compact disc.

== Track listing ==
1. Overture: "My Way"/"I Get a Kick out of You"/"Young at Heart"/"Nancy (With the Laughing Face)"/"There Are Such Things"/"High Hopes"/"I've Got You Under My Skin"/"My Kind of Town"/"All the Way"/"Strangers in the Night" (Paul Anka, Claude François, Jacques Revaux, Gilles Thibault)/(Cole Porter)/(Johnny Richards, Carolyn Leigh)/(Jimmy Van Heusen, Phil Silvers)/(Stanley Adams, Abel Baer, George W. Meyer)/(Sammy Cahn, Van Heusen)/(Porter)/(Cahn, Van Heusen)/(Cahn, Van Heusen)/(Bert Kaempfert, Charles Singleton, Eddie Snyder) – 3:40
2. "Without a Song" (Edward Eliscu, Billy Rose, Vincent Youmans) – 4:12
3. "Where or When" (Lorenz Hart, Richard Rodgers) – 3:40
4. "For Once in My Life" (Ron Miller, Orlando Murden) – 2:48
5. "Nice 'n' Easy" (Alan Bergman, Marilyn Bergman, Lew Spence) – 3:00
6. "My Heart Stood Still" (Hart, Rodgers) – 3:14
7. "Change Partners" (Irving Berlin) – 3:44
8. "It Was a Very Good Year" (Ervin Drake) – 4:51
9. "You Make Me Feel So Young" (Mack Gordon, Josef Myrow) – 3:06
10. "The Gal That Got Away" (Harold Arlen, Ira Gershwin) – 4:23
11. "Theme from New York, New York" (Fred Ebb, John Kander) – 4:11
12. Monologue – 3:02
13. "Come Rain or Come Shine" (Arlen, Johnny Mercer) – 3:43
14. "Bewitched, Bothered and Bewildered" (Hart, Rodgers) – 3:36
15. "Moonlight in Vermont" (Karl Suessdorf, John Blackburn) – 3:53
16. "L.A. Is My Lady" (A. Bergman, M. Bergman, Quincy Jones, Peggy Lipton Jones) – 3:06
17. "I've Got You Under My Skin" – 4:42
18. "Someone to Watch Over Me" (George Gershwin, I. Gershwin) – 3:09
19. "One for My Baby (and One More for the Road)" (Arlen, Mercer) – 5:48
20. "Mack the Knife" (Marc Blitzstein, Bertolt Brecht, Kurt Weill) – 4:20
21. "New York Bows (Theme from New York, New York)" – 1:18

== Personnel ==
- Frank Sinatra – vocals
- Bill Miller – piano, conductor
- Tony Mottola – guitar
- Don Baldini – double bass
- Irving Cottler – drums
- Anthony Gorruso – lead trumpet
