= Marlene Dietrich Overseas =

Studio album by Marlene Dietrich
- Released: 1952
- Genre: Traditional pop
- Length: 25:08
- Label: Columbia Records

Marlene Dietrich chronology
Marlene Dietrich Sings (1947)	Marlene Dietrich Overseas (1952)	Rosie and Marlene (1953)

Marlene Dietrich Overseas (official title including subtitle: Marlene Dietrich Overseas — American Songs In German For The O.S.S) is a Marlene Dietrich album, issued on 10" LP by Columbia Records (catalogue number LP GL105), released in 1952.

Overseas has its origins in Dietrich's contributions to the U.S. war effort during World War II. As an American citizen, she recorded American songs in German for the Office of Strategic Services (OSS) to be broadcast to German audiences as part of American propaganda efforts. After the war, Dietrich kept her copies of the original recordings and later played them for Columbia's Mitch Miller, who, impressed, had her re-record the songs in the studio.

The album was reissued by Columbia as Lili Marlene with four additional tracks, later included in the compilation Art Deco: The Cosmopolitan Marlene Dietrich, and in 1995. The album was praised by music critics.

== Background ==
Marlene Dietrich's album Overseas traces back to her contributions during World War II, when she became one of the first celebrities to support the U.S. war effort after America entered the conflict in 1941. She sold more war bonds than any other star and toured extensively, performing for hundreds of thousands of soldiers across the U.S. and later for Allied troops in Europe and North Africa. Despite the danger of appearing so close to German lines, she explained her actions simply as being done "out of decency". Her performances mixed film songs, her musical saw, and even a comedic "mindreading" act taught to her by Orson Welles.

All the vocals are in German, translated by Lothar Metzl (except for "Lili Marlene") and the orchestra was conducted by Jimmy Carroll. In 1944, Dietrich's was informed that her German-language recordings would be used in the Musak project, a series of propaganda broadcasts meant to weaken enemy morale. Among the songs was "Lili Marleen", already beloved by soldiers on both sides of the war. For her contributions, Major General William J. Donovan, head of the OSS, personally expressed his gratitude, emphasizing the importance of Dietrich's artistry and dedication to the Allied cause.

The original recordings were largely forgotten after the war, but Dietrich retained her copies and later played them for Mitch Miller, the head of A&R at Columbia Records. Impressed by the material, Miller commissioned Dietrich to re-record the songs in the studio. All the vocals on the album are in German, translated by Lothar Metzl (except for "Lili Marlene") and the orchestra was conducted by Jimmy Carroll.

== Release ==
The album was reissued on 12" LP by Columbia as Lili Marlene (Columbia GL 4-17) with the addition of the following tracks: "Das Hobellied", "Du Liegst Mir im Herzen", "Muss i denn" and "Du Hast die Seele Mein", and a cover photo by photographer Milton H. Greene. The eight songs were re-released in CD on a compilation album, Art Deco: The Cosmopolitan Marlene Dietrich.

In 1995, the Spanish record label Blue Moon issued the compilation Marlene Dietrich Sings Lili Marlene and Other Great Songs. The release presented the original eight tracks in their initial sequence, supplemented by eleven selections drawn from Dietrich's previous recordings.

== Critical reception ==
Professional ratings
Review scores
Source	Rating
AllMusic	3.5/5 stars
Billboard	70/100
Down Beat	3/5 stars
The Encyclopedia of Popular Music	3/5 stars

Billboard praised the album reissue titled Lili Marlene, calling it "a sock display item" (thanks to the album cover), noting that Marlene Dietrich "talk-sings with sultry, husky assurance" on a set of standards, resulting in "unusual jockey wax". On April 20, 1959, Billboard featured the cover of Lili Marlene as its Album Cover of the Week.

Cashbox praised Lili Marlene, highlighting Marlene Dietrich's "throaty, sultry voice" singing "with conviction and feeling" on American standards and calling it a "strong specialty issue" with "excellent cover photo attraction". The Down Beat lauded the album, stating that "everything comes off remarkably well", noting that Marlene Dietrich's lack of vocal strength "is more than compensated by the sex she gets into her voice" and by the "novelty of hearing German lyrics set to these familiar melodies".

In a retrospective review Bruce Eder of AllMusic described the album as "a unique body of music in Dietrich’s output" and "well-worth a listen for anyone absorbed in her mystique", noting that she was "still in top form at the time as a singer and entertainer".

== Commercial performance ==
According to the Cashbox magazine of May 28, 1960, the reissued Philips LP Lili Marlene was selling well in the Benelux region.

== Track listing ==
No.	Title	Writer(s)	Length
1.	"Lili Marlene"	Hans Leip / Norbert Schultze	3:09
2.	"Mean To Me / Sei lieb zu mir "	Fred E. Ahlert / Roy Turk	3:11
3.	"Annie Doesn't Live Here Anymore / Fraulein Annie wohnt schon lange nicht hier"	Johnny Burke / Harold Spina / Joe Young	2:58
4.	"The Surrey with the Fringe on Top / Schlittenfahrt "	Oscar Hammerstein II / Richard Rodgers	3:35
5.	"Time On My Hands / Sag' Mir "Adieu""	Harold Adamson / Mack Gordon / Vincent Youmans	3:13
6.	"Taking a Chance On Love / Das ich dich wiederseh"	Vernon Duke / Ted Fetter / John Latouche	2:35
7.	"Miss Otis Regrets / Mein Mann ist verhindert"	Cole Porter	3:47
8.	"I Couldn't Sleep a Wink Last Night / Ich hab' die ganze Nacht geweind"	Jimmy McHugh / Harold Adamson	2:40
Total length:			25:08

== Personnel ==
Credits adapted from the box set Marlene Dietrich Overseas (Columbia, catalog no. ML 2615).

- Directed By [Orchestra] – Jimmy Carroll
- Vocals – Marlene Dietrich

== See also ==
- Marlene Dietrich discography
