= Rosemary Clooney Sings the Music of Irving Berlin =

Studio album by Rosemary Clooney
- Released: 1984
- Recorded: 1984
- Genre: Vocal jazz
- Length: 36:59
- Label: Concord
- Producer: John Burk

Rosemary Clooney chronology
My Buddy (1983)	Rosemary Clooney Sings the Music of Irving Berlin (1984)	Rosemary Clooney Sings Ballads (1985)

Professional ratings
Review scores
Source	Rating
Allmusic	4/5 stars

Rosemary Clooney Sings the Music of Irving Berlin is a 1984 album by Rosemary Clooney, of songs composed by Irving Berlin and released on Concord Jazz label. Most of the album features Clooney singing with a small swing group directed by pianist John Oddo, though Clooney performs two of the selections ("Be Careful, It's My Heart" and "What'll I Do") as duets with guitarist Ed Bickert.

The album is notable for the presence of Kansas City jazz drummer Gus Johnson in the rhythm section. Johnson played with the Count Basie Orchestra and the Jay McShann Orchestra, and replaced Clooney's regular drummer Jake Hanna. Johnson is teamed with bassist Phil Flanigan, who was at the time a regular member of Scott Hamilton's band (which specialized in pre-World War II swing styles). Chris Flory, also a member of the Hamilton band at the time of the session, appears on acoustic rhythm guitar for two of the selections.

== Track listing ==
1. "It's a Lovely Day Today" – 3:16
2. "Be Careful, It's My Heart" – 3:20
3. "Cheek to Cheek" – 5:18
4. "How About Me?" – 4:51
5. "The Best Thing for You" – 4:25
6. "I Got Lost in His Arms" – 3:04
7. "There's No Business Like Show Business" – 4:34
8. "Better Luck Next Time" – 4:30
9. "What'll I Do" – 3:02
10. "Let's Face the Music and Dance" – 4:12

All music and lyrics by Irving Berlin.

== Personnel ==
- Rosemary Clooney – vocals
- Warren Vaché Jr. – cornet, flugelhorn
- Scott Hamilton – tenor saxophone
- John Oddo – piano
- Ed Bickert – guitar (tracks 1,2,5-10)
- Chris Flory – rhythm guitar (tracks 3,7)
- Phil Flanigan – bass
- Gus Johnson – drums
