= Rosemary Clooney Sings Country Hits from the Heart =

Studio album by Rosemary Clooney
- Released: 1963
- Recorded: 1963
- Studio: RCA (Hollywood, California); RCA Victor (Nashville, Tennessee)
- Genre: Vocal jazz, country
- Length: 52:30
- Label: RCA Victor
- Producer: Chet Atkins, Dick Peirce

Rosemary Clooney chronology
Rosie Solves the Swingin' Riddle! (1960)	Rosemary Clooney Sings Country Hits from the Heart (1963)	Love (1963)

Rosemary Clooney Sings Country Hits from the Heart is a 1963 RCA Victor studio album by Rosemary Clooney, arranged by Marty Paich. It was her first album of country music, the second being Look My Way in 1976.

== Track listing ==
1. "Any Time" (Herbert Lawson)
2. "I Really Don't Want to Know" (Don Robertson, Howard Barnes)
3. "Just Because" (Bob Shelton, Joe Shelton, Sid Robin)
4. "Give Myself a Party" (Don Gibson)
5. "Love Has Come My Way" (Don Gibson)
6. "I'm So Lonesome I Could Cry" (Hank Williams)
7. "Please Help Me, I'm Falling" (Don Robertson, Hal Blair)
8. "If I Can Stay Away Long Enough" (Benny Martin)
9. "This Ole House" (Stuart Hamblen)
10. "How's the World Treating You" (Chet Atkins, Boudleaux Bryant, Bridgette Bryant)
11. "Beautiful Brown Eyes" (Alton Delmore, Arthur Smith)
12. "Kiss Him for Me" (Clyde Pitts)

== Personnel ==
=== Performance ===
- Rosemary Clooney – vocal
- Marty Paich – arranger, conductor
- Velma Williams Smith - rhythm guitar
