= All Alone (Irving Berlin song) =

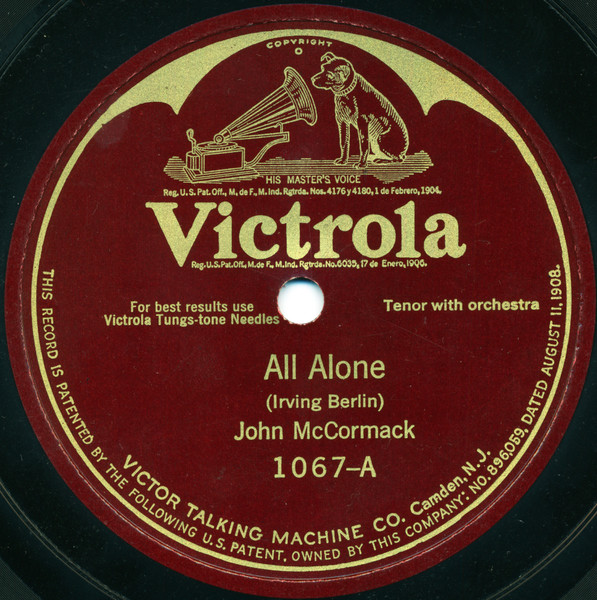

Song
- Published: 1924
- Songwriter: Irving Berlin

"All Alone" is a popular waltz ballad composed by Irving Berlin in 1924. It was interpolated into the Broadway show The Music Box Revue of 1924, where it was sung by Grace Moore and Oscar Shaw. Moore sat at one end of the stage under a tightly focused spotlight, singing it into a telephone, while Shaw sat at the other, doing the same.

== 1925 recordings ==
There were many successful recordings of it in 1925, including those by Al Jolson, John McCormack, Paul Whiteman, Cliff Edwards, Abe Lyman, Ben Selvin and Lewis James.

== Other recordings include ==
The song became a standard and has been recorded many times, among the recordings:

- Connee Boswell (1938)
- June Winters (1942, Continental Records)
- Wayne King's Orchestra (vocal by Nancy Evans), recorded on March 4, 1946. The recording was released by RCA Victor Records as catalog number 20-1897.
- Carmen Cavallaro's Orchestra (vocal by Dick Haymes), recorded on December 28, 1947. The recording was released by Decca Records as catalog number 24423.
- Julie London, for her 1956 album Lonely Girl.
- Thelonious Monk recorded the tune for his 1957 album Thelonious Himself.
- Connee Boswell - for her album Connee Boswell Sings Irving Berlin - A Golden Anniversary Tribute (1958)
- Pat Boone - included in his album Pat Boone Sings Irving Berlin (1958)
- Burl Ives - for his album Burl Ives Sings Irving Berlin (1960)
- Alma Cogan (1961)
- Frank Sinatra for his album All Alone (1962)
- Rosemary Clooney - for her album Thanks for Nothing (1963)
- Bing Crosby for his album Bing Crosby's Treasury – The Songs I Love (1968). Crosby also included the song in a medley on his album On the Sentimental Side recorded in 1962, but not released until 2010.
- Doris Day, recorded on June 6, 1967, not issued on a single, but included in her album, The Love Album.
- Sarah Vaughan, for her 1967 album Sassy Swings Again.

== Film and television appearances ==
- The Plastic Age (1925) - Donald Keith sings the song as part of a hazing ritual at the behest of Clara Bow. As a silent film, it includes lyrics and sheet music.
- Performed by Minnie Mouse in The Gorilla Mystery (1930)
- Alexander's Ragtime Band (1938) - Alice Faye sings the chorus ('wond'ring where you are, and how you are, and if you are all alone too")
- It was performed by Lucie Arnaz in the Here's Lucy episode "Mod, Mod Lucy"
- Miss Piggy sang the song in an episode of The Muppet Show.
