= In a Little Spanish Town =

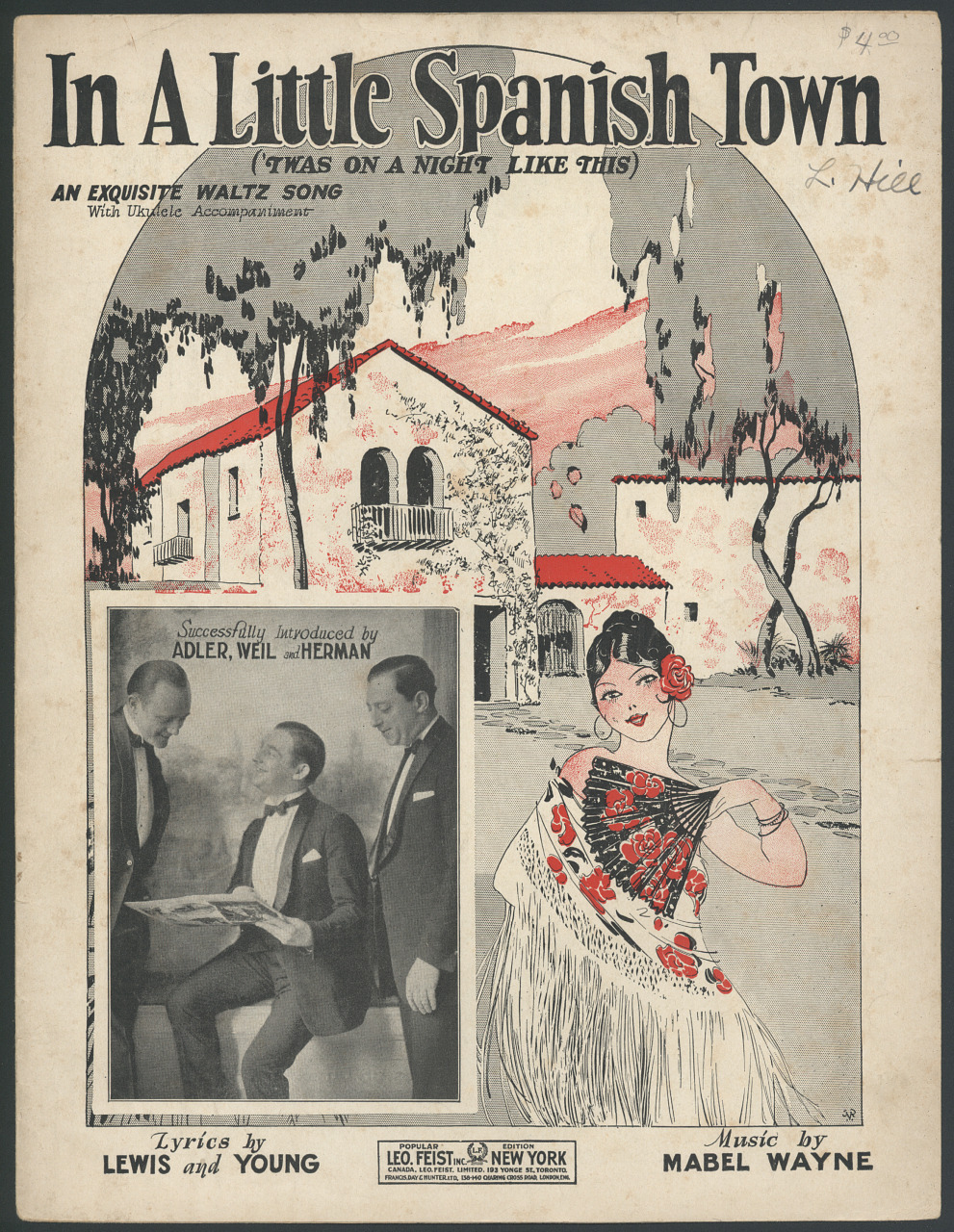
Sheet music cover, 1926

"In a Little Spanish Town ('Twas on a Night Like This)" is a popular song published in 1926. The music was written by Mabel Wayne, and the lyrics by Sam M. Lewis & Joe Young.

With Jack Fulton's vocals, the song was a 1927 hit for Paul Whiteman & his Orchestra as his recording topped the U.S. charts for eight weeks.

The song had continuing popularity for several decades and was covered in later recordings. Virginia O'Brien's recording (a zany version taken from a live nightclub performance) can be found on a 1984 AEI LP, "Virginia O'Brien Salutes the Great MGM Musicals."

Bing Crosby had sung it early in his career in 1926 on stage and later on radio during his time with the Paul Whiteman Orchestra. In 1955 he recorded it for use on his radio show as a cha-cha with accompaniment from Buddy Cole and His Trio. This proved so popular that Decca Records mastered the radio track and issued it as a single. This charted briefly in 1956 at No. 49 in the USA and No. 22 in the UK.

== Legal issues ==
A similar melody to "In a Little Spanish Town" was used for "Why", written by Bob Marcucci (words) and Peter de Angelis in 1959, which topped the charts for Frankie Avalon in the USA that year and then for Anthony Newley in the UK in 1960. Copyright cases were launched on both sides of the Atlantic but neither succeeded. The English High Court said that there was a degree of similarity but no infringement of copyright because the plaintiffs could not prove that there was a conscious or subconscious act of copying.

== Other recordings ==
- Bob Eberly and Helen O'Connell recorded it in 1951.
- Rosemary Clooney recorded the song in 1959 for her album A Touch of Tabasco.
- Dean Martin recorded the song in 1962 for his album Dino Latino.
- Herb Alpert recorded the tune for his 1967 album Sounds Like....

== Pop culture ==
- In the 1939 comedy short Pest from the West, Buster Keaton attempts to sing it, but a vase or other object drops on his head after each line.
- In the season 4 I Love Lucy episode "Ricky's Movie Offer" (1954), part of the song is played on trumpet by James Dobson.
