= Don't Get Around Much Anymore =

Song by Duke Ellington
- Written: 1940 (music), 1942 (lyrics)
- Published: 1942 by Robbins Music
- Composer: Duke Ellington
- Lyricist: Bob Russell

"Don't Get Around Much Anymore" is a jazz standard with music by Duke Ellington. It was originally an instrumental entitled "Never No Lament", and in that form was first recorded by Ellington and his orchestra on May 4, 1940. It quickly became a hit after Bob Russell wrote the "Don't Get Around Much Anymore" lyrics for it in 1942.

Two different recordings of "Don't Get Around Much Anymore", one by The Ink Spots and the 1940 instrumental by Ellington's band, reached No. 1 on the US Billboard R&B chart in 1943. Both were top-ten pop records, along with a version by Glen Gray. The Duke Ellington version reached No. 8 on the pop chart.

== Other versions ==
- Mose Allison – Young Man Mose, (Prestige, 1958)
- Mose Allison – Creek Bank (Prestige, 1975)
- Louis Armstrong with his All-Stars and Duke Ellington – The Great Reunion (1961) and included on The Great Summit
- Louis Armstrong – I've Got the World on a String (1960)
- Tony Bennett and Miguel Bosé – Viva Duets (2010)
- Michael Bublé – BaBalu (1996)
- Joan Cartwright with Lonnie Smith – In Pursuit of a Melody (1991)
- Chicago – Night & Day Big Band (1995)
- June Christy – Ballads for Night People and Spotlight on June Christy (1995)
- The Coasters – One by One (1960)
- Nat King Cole – Just One of Those Things (1957)
- Harry Connick Jr. – When Harry Met Sally... (1989)
- Sam Cooke – My Kind of Blues (1961)
- Hank Crawford – Dig These Blues (Atlantic, 1965)
- Bing Crosby – recorded on April 15, 1977, and included on the album A Tribute to Duke
- Ella Fitzgerald – Ella Fitzgerald Sings the Duke Ellington Songbook (Verve, 1957)
- Eydie Gormé – Eydie Swings the Blues (1957)
- Glen Gray and the Casa Loma Orchestra (vocals by Kenny Sargent and LeBrun Sisters) – recorded July 27, 1942 for Decca. This reached No. 7 in the pop chart. (1943)
- The Ink Spots reached No. 1 on the R&B chart for two non-consecutive weeks and No. 2 on the pop chart (1943)
- Etta James – The Second Time Around (Argo, 1961)
- Anne Murray – I'll Be Seeing You (2004)
- Anna Nalick - The Blackest Crow (2019)
- Willie Nelson – Stardust (1978)
- Patti Page – Music for Two in Love (1956)
