= Bing Crosby Sings the Great Country Hits =

Studio album by Bing Crosby
- Released: October 1965
- Recorded: October 1963
- Genres: Country, vocal pop
- Length: 31:47
- Label: Capitol
- Producer: Simon Rady

Bing Crosby chronology
12 Songs of Christmas (w/ Frank Sinatra and Fred Waring) (1964)	Bing Crosby Sings the Great Country Hits (1965)	That Travelin' Two-Beat (w/ Rosemary Clooney) (1965)

Bing Crosby Sings the Great Country Hits is the thirty-third solo studio album by American singer and actor Bing Crosby for Capitol Records on October 29 and 31, 1963.

The album was re-released on CD by Collectors' Choice Music (CCM 221-2) in 2001, paired with That Travelin' Two-Beat under the title "Two Classic Albums from Bing Crosby".

== Reception ==
Professional ratings
Review scores
Source	Rating
Record Mirror	4/5 stars

Billboard reviewed the album saying, "For the first time Crosby devotes his vast musical talent to only top country material. Demonstrating his feeling and understanding of lyric in such standouts as the classic “Four Walls” and “Jealous Heart.” Crosby maintains his own great style."

Variety liked it too. "The consistency of Bing Crosby’s talent over the decades is an authentic show biz phenomenon. In this set, the veteran singer finds himself in a very congenial groove with a group of backwoods ballads which he delivers with an easygoing lilt just tailored for this material."

BING magazine: “Without question, this new Crosby album has raised more comment than any other new release for many a year - never has my mailbag been filled with so much comment devoted to the latest record release…generally the album, except for the comment re Bing having a cold on some of the tracks, is being received with great enthusiasm all round.”

Side one
No.	Title	Writer(s)	Length
1.	"Oh Lonesome Me"	Don Gibson	2:51
2.	"Heartaches by the Number"	Harlan Howard	2:53
3.	"Four Walls"	Marvin Moore, George Campbell	3:43
4.	"Crazy Arms"	Chuck Seals, Ralph Mooney	2:25
5.	"Bouquet of Roses"	Steve Nelson, Bob Hilliard	2:36
6.	"Wabash Cannonball"	A. P. Carter	2:09

Side two
No.	Title	Writer(s)	Length
1.	"Wolverton Mountain"	Merle Kilgore, Claude King	3:02
2.	"Hello Walls"	Willie Nelson	2:07
3.	"A Little Bitty Tear"	Hank Cochran	2:25
4.	"Jealous Heart"	Jenny Lou Carson	2:37
5.	"Still"	Bill Anderson	2:51
6.	"Sunflower"	Mack David	2:08

== Personnel ==
Details of the sessions and the musicians involved are:

October 29, 1963 9 AM-12:30 PM

Musicians: Glen Campbell, Barney Kessel, Bill Pitman (gtr), Don Bagley (bass), Gene Garf (pno), Ed Hall (dr), Emil Richards (Radocchia) (perc), Robert Barene, Isadore Roman, Ralph Schaeffer, John DeVoogdt, Elliott Fisher, John Vidor, Darrel Terwilliger, Tibor Zelig (vln), Alexander Neiman, Allan Harshman (vla), Hyman Gold, Jesse Ehrlich (cello), Bill Justis (ldr), Hy Lesnick (O.M.)

50785 Still - Cap (Int) ST-23063

50786 Wabash Cannonball

50787 A Little Bitty Tear - Cap (Int) ST-23063

50788 Jealous Heart

October 31, 1963 9 AM-12 Noon

Musicians: Glen Campbell, Barney Kessel, Bill Pitman (gtr), Don Bagley (bass), Gene Garf (pno), Ed Hall (dr), Emil Richards (Radocchia) (perc), Robert Barene, Isadore Roman, Sidney Sharp, John DeVoogdt, Elliott Fisher, John Vidor, Darrel Terwilliger, Victor Arno (vln), Alexander Neiman, Allan Harshman (vla), Hyman Gold, Jesse Ehrlich (cello), Bill Justis (ldr), Hy Lesnick (O.M.)

50795 Four Walls - Cap. SM-11737 (Int) ST-23063

50796 Wolverton Mountain

50797 Hello Walls - (Int) ST-23063

50798 Crazy Arms

October 31, 1963 1 PM-4:30 PM

Musicians: David Gates, Barney Kessel, Louis Morell (gtr), Don Bagley (bass), Gene Garf (pno), Ed Hall (dr), Emil Richards (Radocchia) (perc), Robert Barene, Sidney Sharp, John DeVoogdt, Darrel Terwilliger, Nathan Ross, Emanuel Moss, Arthur Brown, Joseph Stepansky (vln), Alexander Neiman, Allan Harshman (vla), Hyman Gold, Jesse Ehrlich (cello), Bill Justis (ldr), Hy Lesnick (O.M.)

50799 Oh, Lonesome Me - Cap. SM-11737, (Int) ST-23063

50800 Bouquet of Roses

50801 Heartaches By the Number

50802 Sunflower
