= Classic Sinatra II =

Compilation album by Frank Sinatra
- Released: June 2, 2009
- Recorded: 1953–1959
- Genres: Vocal jazz; traditional pop
- Length: 55:37
- Label: Capitol

Frank Sinatra chronology
Live at the Meadowlands (2009)	Classic Sinatra II (2009)	Sinatra: Collector's Edition (2009)

Professional ratings
Review scores
Source	Rating
Allmusic	4.5/5 stars

Classic Sinatra II is a 2009 compilation album by Frank Sinatra, that consists of 21 tracks he recorded from Capitol Records.

== Track listing ==
1. "Something's Gotta Give" (Johnny Mercer) - 2:39
2. "Too Marvelous for Words" (Mercer, Richard Whiting) - 2:28
3. "Love and Marriage" (Sammy Cahn, Jimmy Van Heusen) - 2:38
4. "From This Moment On" (Cole Porter) - 3:53
5. "(Love Is) The Tender Trap" (Cahn, Van Heusen) - 2:57
6. "I Get Along Without You Very Well (Except Sometimes)" (Hoagy Carmichael, Jane Brown Thompson) - 3:42
7. "All of Me" (Gerald Marks, Seymour Simons) - 2:07
8. "I Thought About You" (Van Heusen, Mercer) - 2:29
9. "Moonlight in Vermont" (Jack Blackburn, Karl Suessdorf) - 3:33
10. "High Hopes" (Cahn, Van Heusen) - 2:42
11. "Learnin' The Blues" (Dolores Silvers) - 3:02
12. "Here's That Rainy Day" (Van Heusen, Johnny Burke) - 3:34
13. "Pennies from Heaven" (Arthur Johnston, Burke) - 2:43
14. "I've Got a Crush on You" (George Gershwin, Ira Gershwin) - 2:17
15. "Guess I'll Hang My Tears Out to Dry" (Jule Styne, Cahn) - 4:00
16. "Memories of You" (Andy Razaf, Eubie Blake) - 2:54
17. "Love is Here to Stay" (G. Gershwin, I. Gershwin) - 2:40
18. "(Ah, the Apple Trees) When the World Was Young" (Mercer, M. Philippe-Gerard, Angele Marie T. Vannier) - 3:47
19. "Just One of Those Things" (Porter) - 3:14
20. "Angel Eyes" (Matt Dennis, Tom Adair) - 3:48
21. "This Can't Be Love" (Previously unreleased) (Richard Rodgers, Lorenz Hart) - 1:40

== See also ==
- Classic Sinatra: His Greatest Performances 1953-1960 (2000)
