= Hollywood's Best =

Studio album by Rosemary Clooney and Harry James
- Released: October 1952
- Genre: Traditional pop
- Label: Columbia
- Producer: Mitch Miller

Rosemary Clooney chronology
Hollywood's Best (1952)	Rosie and Marlene (1953)

Harry James chronology
Soft Lights, Sweet Trumpet (1952)	Hollywood's Best (1952)	Trumpet After Midnight (1954)

Singles from Hollywood's Best
- 1. "You'll Never Know" Released: October 1952

Hollywood's Best is a studio album by American singer Rosemary Clooney and American instrumentalist Harry James. The original album was released by Columbia Records in October 1952 as an eight-song collection which all first won accolades from the Academy Awards. It was expanded into a 12-track collection in 1954 that featured solo recordings by Clooney and James respectively. It received positive reviews from music critics and publications following its release. Its only single was the US top 20 song, "You'll Never Know".

== Background ==
Rosemary Clooney had recently broken into mainstream success with a series of popular singles like "Come On-a My House", "Half as Much" and Tenderly". Meanwhile, Harry James had been a consistent presence since the big band era, finding popularity during the 1940s with singles like "You Made Me Love You (I Didn't Want to Do It)". As Clooney's popularity continued rising and James's continually slipped, Columbia Records decided to arrange a collaborative studio album for them.

== Recording and content ==
Billboard announced in April 1951 that Mitch Miller would serve as the album's sole producer. The album was a collection of tracks that won Best Original Song at the Academy Awards. The original 1952 released featured eight songs, consisting of Clooney on vocals and James on trumpet. Among the recordings were The Gay Divorcees "The Continental" and Here Comes the Grooms "In the Cool, Cool, Cool of the Evening". The 1954 expanded release featured four additional songs, totaling the collection to 12 tracks. The newer version included Clooney's "Come On-a My House" and the James's instrumental "Stella by Starlight".

== Critical reception ==
Hollywood's Best received positive reviews from both music critics and writers since its original release. DownBeat magazine named it among their "Best Bets" in a 1953 publication, while Billboard magazine found it to be "loaded with showmanship and musical talent" along with believing it would appeal to film fans. AllMusic's William Ruhlmann rated it four out five stars, finding that it showcased "the singer's [Clooney] clearly enunciated matter-of-fact phrasing and the instrumentalist's [James] characteristically broad tone on some well-loved material." Will Friedwald of the book, A Biographical Guide to the Great Jazz and Pop Singers, called it "an impressive entry" in Clooney's repertoire when compared to the novelty songs she was recording during the period.

== Release and singles ==
Hollywood's Best was originally released in October 1952 by Columbia Records as a ten-inch vinyl LP, featuring four songs on each side of the disc. In July 1954, DownBeat announced that the album would among several LP's that would be expanded to feature a more extensive track listing. The expanded version was officially released in August 1954 and was released an in LP format as well. Six tracks were now offered on each side of the disc. One single was spawned from the original album in October 1952: "You'll Never Know". It reached the top 20 of the US Billboard Best Sellers in Stores, peaking at number 18 position there. An international single release featured "The Continental" on the B-side, which reached the number ten position in Australia in 1952.

== Track listing ==
=== Original version ===
Side one
No.	Title	Writer(s)	Length
1.	"You'll Never Know" (from Hello, Frisco, Hello)	Gordon; Warren	–
2.	"On the Atchison, Topeka and the Santa Fe" (from The Harvey Girls)	Warren; Mercer	–
3.	"It Might as Well Be Spring" (from State Fair)	Hammerstein II; Rodgers	–
4.	"Over the Rainbow" (from The Wizard of Oz)	Harburg; Arlen	–

Side two
No.	Title	Writer(s)	Length
1.	"Sweet Leilani" (from Waikiki Wedding)	Owens	–
2.	"The Continental (You Kiss While Dancing)" (from The Gay Divorcee)	Magidson; Conrad	–
3.	"When You Wish Upon a Star" (from Pinocchio)	Washington; Harline	–
4.	"In the Cool, Cool, Cool of the Evening" (from Here Comes the Groom)	Carmichael; Mercer	–

=== Expanded version ===
Side one
No.	Title	Writer(s)	Length
1.	"You'll Never Know" (from Hello, Frisco, Hello)	Gordon; Warren	–
2.	"On the Atchison, Topeka and the Santa Fe" (from The Harvey Girls)	Warren; Mercer	–
3.	"Ruby" (from Ruby Gentry)	Roemheld; Parish	–
4.	"It Might as Well Be Spring" (from State Fair)	Hammerstein II; Rodgers	–
5.	"Come On-a My House" (from the Circle Theatre Prod. The Son)	Bagdasarian; Saroyan	–
6.	"Over the Rainbow" (from The Wizard of Oz)	Harburg; Arlen	–

Side two
No.	Title	Writer(s)	Length
1.	"Sweet Leilani" (from Waikiki Wedding)	Owens	–
2.	"The Continental (You Kiss While Dancing)" (from The Gay Divorcee)	Magidson; Conrad	–
3.	"Stella by Starlight" (from The Uninvited)	Washington; Young	–
4.	"When You Wish Upon a Star" (from Pinocchio)	Washington; Harline	–
5.	"Red Garters" (from Red Garters)	Livingston; Evans	–
6.	"In the Cool, Cool, Cool of the Evening" (from Here Comes the Groom)	Carmichael; Mercer	–

== Release history ==
Release history and formats for Hollywood's Best
Region	Date	Format	Label	Ref.
Various	October 1952	10-inch vinyl LP	Columbia Records	
Various	August 1954	Expanded vinyl LP	Columbia Records	
Various	1959	Vinyl LP	Harmony Records	
Japan	1975	Vinyl LP	CBS/Sony	
Japan	1987	Compact disc	CBS/Sony	
