= My Buddy (album) =

Studio album by Rosemary Clooney
- Released: 1983
- Recorded: 1983
- Genre: Jazz
- Length: 44:10
- Label: Concord
- Producer: Carl E. Jefferson

Rosemary Clooney chronology
Rosemary Clooney Sings the Music of Harold Arlen (1983)	My Buddy (1983)	Rosemary Clooney Sings the Music of Irving Berlin (1983)

Woody Herman chronology
World Class (1982)	My Buddy (1983)	Woody's Gold Star (1987)

Professional ratings
Review scores
Source	Rating
Allmusic	4/5 stars

My Buddy is a 1983 album by Rosemary Clooney, accompanied by Woody Herman and his orchestra.

== Track listing ==
1. "I Believe in Love" (Alan and Marilyn Bergman, Kenny Loggins) – 4:56
2. "The Summer Knows" (A. Bergman, M. Bergman, Michel Legrand) – 4:47
3. "The Glory of Love" (Billy Hill) – 3:34
4. "You're Gonna Hear from Me" (André Previn, Dory Previn) – 3:40
5. "Don't Let Me Be Lonely Tonight" (James Taylor) – 5:09
6. "I'm Beginning to See the Light" (Duke Ellington, Don George, Johnny Hodges) – 3:37
7. "My Buddy" (Walter Donaldson, Gus Kahn) – 4:26
8. "You've Made Me So Very Happy" (Berry Gordy, Patrice Holloway, Brenda Holloway, Frank Wilson) – 4:39

== Personnel ==
- Rosemary Clooney – vocals
- Woody Herman and his Orchestra
