= Rosemary Clooney Sings the Music of Harold Arlen =

Studio album by Rosemary Clooney
- Released: 1983
- Recorded: 1983
- Genre: Vocal jazz
- Length: 35:51
- Label: Concord
- Producer: John Burk

Rosemary Clooney chronology
Rosemary Clooney Sings the Music of Cole Porter (1982)	Rosemary Clooney Sings the Music of Harold Arlen (1983)	My Buddy (1983)

Professional ratings
Review scores
Source	Rating
Allmusic	4/5 stars

Rosemary Clooney Sings the Music of Harold Arlen is a 1983 album by Rosemary Clooney, of songs composed by Harold Arlen. The album was the first of five to feature guitarist Ed Bickert, and it also featured longtime Clooney collaborators Scott Hamilton, Warren Vaché Jr., and Jake Hanna. The album is also the only small-group album in her Concord discography not to feature either Nat Pierce or John Oddo on piano. Instead, Dave McKenna, who had a long-established solo career as a jazz pianist, joined Clooney for the album.

== Track listing ==
1. "Hooray for Love" (Leo Robin) – 3:09
2. "Happiness is a Thing Called Joe" (Yip Harburg) – 4:32
3. "One for My Baby (and One More for the Road)" (Johnny Mercer) – 3:46
4. "Get Happy" (Ted Koehler) – 3:05
5. "Ding-Dong! The Witch Is Dead" (Harburg) – 3:23
6. "Out of This World" (Mercer) – 4:56
7. "My Shining Hour" (Mercer) – 3:48
8. "Let's Take the Long Way Home" (Mercer) – 3:31
9. "Stormy Weather" (Koehler) – 5:41

All music by Harold Arlen, lyricists indicated.

== Personnel ==
- Rosemary Clooney – vocals
- Scott Hamilton – tenor saxophone
- Warren Vaché Jr.
- Dave McKenna – piano
- Ed Bickert – guitar
- Steve Wallace – bass
- Jake Hanna – drums
