= Rosemary Clooney Sings the Music of Cole Porter =

Studio album by Rosemary Clooney
- Released: January 1982
- Recorded: 1982
- Genre: Vocal jazz
- Length: 56:24
- Label: Concord
- Producer: John Burk

Rosemary Clooney chronology
With Love (1981)	Rosemary Clooney Sings the Music of Cole Porter (1982)	Rosemary Clooney Sings the Music of Harold Arlen (1983)

Professional ratings
Review scores
Source	Rating
Allmusic	4/5 stars

Rosemary Clooney Sings the Music of Cole Porter is a 1982 album by Rosemary Clooney, of songs by Cole Porter.

== Track listing ==
1. "In the Still of the Night" – 3:22
2. "My Heart Belongs to Daddy" – 4:10
3. "I Get a Kick Out of You" – 3:43
4. "Get Out of Town" – 3:22
5. "I Concentrate on You" – 5:53
6. "Just One of Those Things" – 4:07
7. "I've Got You Under My Skin" – 3:52
8. "It's De-Lovely" – 3:09
9. "You're the Top" – 3:14
10. "Anything Goes" – 3:01

All music and lyrics by Cole Porter.

== Personnel ==
- Rosemary Clooney – vocals
- Scott Hamilton - tenor saxophone
- Warren Vache - cornet and flugelhorn
- David Ladd - flute
- Cal Tjader - vibraphone
- Nat Pierce - piano
- Cal Collins - guitar
- Bob Maize - bass
- Jake Hanna - drums
