= Rosie Solves the Swingin' Riddle! =

Studio album by Rosemary Clooney
- Released: 1961
- Recorded: May 25 – June 2, 1960
- Genre: Vocal jazz
- Length: 30:44
- Label: RCA Victor
- Producer: Rosemary Clooney

Rosemary Clooney chronology
Clap Hands! Here Comes Rosie! (1960)	Rosie Solves the Swingin' Riddle! (1961)	Rosemary Clooney Sings Country Hits from the Heart (1963)

Professional ratings
Review scores
Source	Rating
Allmusic	4.5/5 stars
New Record Mirror	5/5

Rosie Solves the Swingin' Riddle! is a 1961 studio album by Rosemary Clooney, arranged by Nelson Riddle and released by RCA Victor.

The first of two albums that Clooney and Riddle recorded together, the two were having an affair at the time of the recording, which broke up their respective marriages. Their second album, Love, was released in 1963.

== Track listing ==
1. "Get Me to the Church on Time" (Alan Jay Lerner, Frederick Loewe) – 2:14
2. "Angry" (Henry Brunies, Merritt Brunies, Jules Cassard, Dudley Mecum) – 2:25
3. "I Get Along Without You Very Well" (Hoagy Carmichael, Jane Brown Thompson) – 2:44
4. "How Am I to Know?" (Jack King, Dorothy Parker) – 2:51
5. "You Took Advantage of Me" (Lorenz Hart, Richard Rodgers) – 2:59
6. "April in Paris" (Vernon Duke, Yip Harburg) – 2:40
7. "I Ain't Got Nobody (And Nobody Cares for Me)" (Roger Graham, Dave Peyton, Spencer Williams) – 2:54
8. "Some of These Days" (Shelton Brooks) – 2:16
9. "By Myself" (Howard Dietz, Arthur Schwartz) – 2:30
10. "Shine On, Harvest Moon" (Jack Norworth, Nora Bayes) – 2:20
11. "Cabin in the Sky" (Duke, John Latouche) – 2:35
12. "Limehouse Blues" (Philip Braham, Douglas Furber) – 2:16

== Personnel ==
- Rosemary Clooney – vocal
- Nelson Riddle – arranger, conductor
