= Love (Rosemary Clooney album) =

1961 studio album by Rosemary Clooney released 1963

Studio album by Rosemary Clooney
- Released: 1963
- Recorded: March 6–24, 1961
- Genre: Vocal jazz
- Length: 45:20
- Label: Reprise
- Producer: Rosemary Clooney

Rosemary Clooney chronology
Rosemary Clooney Sings Country Hits from the Heart (1963)	Love (1963)	Thanks for Nothing (1965)

Professional ratings
Review scores
Source	Rating
Allmusic	4.5/5 stars
New Record Mirror	3/5 stars

Love is a studio album by Rosemary Clooney, arranged by Nelson Riddle, recorded in 1961 but not released until 1963.

Clooney and Riddle were having an affair at the time of the recording, and this was the second album that Riddle had arranged for Clooney. They recorded Rosie Solves the Swingin' Riddle! in 1960 for RCA Victor Records, and the songs that make up Love were recorded the next year. RCA Victor didn't release Love at the time, and Frank Sinatra bought the master tapes for Love from RCA when he signed Clooney to his record label, Reprise Records in 1963.

Reviewing the CD reissue of the album in 1995, New York Times music critic Stephen Holden compared Love to Riddle's legendary 1955 collaboration with Frank Sinatra, In the Wee Small Hours. "Ms. Clooney was 32 when she recorded the album," Holden wrote, "and her singing is hushed and lovely."

== Track listing ==
1. "Invitation" (Bronisław Kaper, Paul Francis Webster) – 2:50
2. "I Wish It So" (Marc Blitzstein) – 4:09
3. "Yours Sincerely" (Lorenz Hart, Richard Rodgers) – 3:25
4. "Imagination" (Johnny Burke, Jimmy Van Heusen) – 4:04
5. "Find the Way" (Ian Bernard) – 3:49
6. "How Will I Remember You" (Walter Lloyd Gross, Carl Sigman) – 4:20
7. "Why Shouldn't I?" (Cole Porter) – 3:23
8. "More Than You Know" (Edward Eliscu, Billy Rose, Vincent Youmans) – 3:20
9. "You Started Something" (Floyd Huddleston, Al Rinker) – 2:32
10. "It Never Entered My Mind" (Hart, Rodgers) – 4:38
11. "If I Forget You" (Irving Caesar) – 4:31
12. "Someone to Watch Over Me" (George Gershwin, Ira Gershwin) – 3:37

== Personnel ==
=== Performance ===
- Rosemary Clooney – vocal
- Nelson Riddle – arranger, conductor
