= Nice to Be Around (Rosemary Clooney album) =

Studio album by Rosemary Clooney
- Released: 1977
- Recorded: 1977
- Genre: Vocal jazz
- Length: 52:30
- Label: United Artists; UAS 30008
- Producer: Del Newman

Rosemary Clooney chronology
Look My Way (1976)	Nice to Be Around (1977)	A Tribute to Duke (1977)

Professional ratings
Review scores
Source	Rating
Allmusic	3/5 stars

Nice to Be Around is a 1977 album by Rosemary Clooney.

== Track listing ==
1. "You" (Randy Edelman) – 4:15
2. "50 Ways to Leave Your Lover" (Paul Simon) – 4:28
3. "Send in the Clowns" (Stephen Sondheim) – 3:47
4. "Music" (James Taylor) – 4:40
5. "Thank You Baby" (Bruce Johnston) – 4:29
6. "All by Myself" (Eric Carmen, Sergei Rachmaninoff) – 5:10
7. "My Little Town" (Paul Simon) – 3:55
8. "The Hungry Years" (Neil Sedaka, Howard Greenfield) – 4:26
9. "I Won't Last a Day Without You" (Roger Nichols, Paul Williams) – 5:20
10. "Nice to Be Around" (Paul Williams, John Williams) – 4:23

== Personnel ==
=== Performance ===
- Rosemary Clooney – vocals
- Frank Ricotti – percussion
- Harold Fisher – drums
- Michael Moran – keyboards
- Laurence Juber – guitar
- Ray Cooper – percussion
- Gordon Beck – keyboards
- Barry De Souza – drums
- Stan Sulzmann – tenor saxophone, flute
- Alan Parker – guitar
- Chas Mills – backing vocals
- Kate Robbins – backing vocals
- Stephanie De Sykes – backing vocals
- Del Newman - arrangements
- David Katz - conductor

Technical

- Richard Dodd - engineer
- Alan Warner - executive producer
