= Rosie and Marlene =

EP by Rosemary Clooney and Marlene Dietrich
- Released: July 1953
- Genre: Traditional pop
- Label: Columbia Records

Rosemary Clooney chronology
Hollywood's Best (1952)	Rosie and Marlene (1953)	Irving Berlin's White Christmas (1954)

Marlene Dietrich chronology
Marlene Dietrich Overseas (1952)	Rosie and Marlene (1953)	At the Café de Paris (1954)

Rosie and Marlene is a collaborative extended play (EP) by American singer Rosemary Clooney and German actress and singer Marlene Dietrich, released in 1953 by Columbia Records as a 7-inch (45 RPM) record. The work is part of the Columbia Extended Play series and features four duet tracks.

Critics highlighted the humorous and novelty appeal of the singles, praising the comedic performances and strong commercial potential. The tracks were noted for their pleasant ragtime style and were considered to have significant appeal for disc jockeys.

== Background ==
In the early 1950s, Marlene Dietrich strategically revitalized her career as a recording artist. She partnered with Mitch Miller, the powerful head of artists and repertoire at Columbia Records, who saw commercial potential in her unique appeal. This collaboration first yielded the 1951 album Overseas, a critically acclaimed project where Dietrich rerecorded American standards like "Miss Otis Regrets" and "The Surrey With the Fringe on Top" in German.

Building on the momentum of Overseas, Miller paired Dietrich with rising star Rosemary Clooney, then one of the most popular singers of the decade. Their collaboration produced a series of lighthearted "barrel-house duets" that played on their contrasting personas: the worldly Dietrich and the naive Clooney. The pairing resulted in the 1952 Top 40 novelty hit "Too Old to Cut the Mustard" (featuring Stan Freeman on harpsichord), which sold 100,000 copies in the first week of release, followed by other songs like "Good for Nothin'". Although Dietrich declined offers to perform the act on stage, they recorded several more tracks, which were later compiled in the present EP. Two songs recorded by the duo were never released in the US, "Besides (He's A Man)" and "Land, Sea And Air". The songs were released in UK as a single By Philips (catalog no. PB 314).

The duets were a professional, rather than personal, pursuit for Dietrich, who reportedly undertook them because "a hit record seemed like a good idea at the time", Behind the scenes, she maintained her characteristic wit, with Clooney later recalling how Dietrich once advised her, "I know you're working, Rosie, but you really should comb your hair!" Concurrently with the Clooney sessions, Dietrich continued her solo work, spending days in a New York studio meticulously rerecording a repertoire of English-language standards such as "Come Rain or Come Shine", "Lili Marlene", and "Mean to Me".

== Release ==
The EP was issued in the United States in July 1953 with the catalogue number Columbia B-1699.

== Critical reception ==
The singles released from the EP received attention from music publications.

Cash Box described "Too Old to Cut the Mustard" as a "surprise novelty of the year", noting that the pairing of Clooney and Dietrich was "very good". In another review, the magazine described "Dot's Nice – Donna Fight!" as "cute listening" that "might catch on", and "It's the Same" as "a cute rag time ditty" "that should get laughs and spins". According to Billboard, "Too Old to Cut the Mustard" was a 'Best Seller' for the week ending October 4, 1952. The single peaked at #12 in Billboard Hot 100 chart, and #17 in the ARIA singles chart.

Billboard considered "Dot's Nice – Donna Fight!" to have strong appeal for disc jockeys, and that the singers "tickle ribs" with their performance. The single was listed on Billboard's 'Best Selling Popular Records' chart within the prominent 'Columbia Best Buys' section, thanks to its sales in the week ending May 9.

Down Beat noted that the duet contained comedic moments, though it regretted the omission of the original lyric line that inspired the title "Dot's Nice". The magazine characterized "It's the Same" as a milder track. In addition to written reviews, "Too Old to Cut the Mustard" was selected for Down Beat's Five Star Discs, a list highlighting notable popular releases of the period.

== Commercial performance ==
According to Steven Bach's biography Marlene Dietrich: Life and Legend the collection of duets was a commercial success, capitalizing on the popularity of their Top 40 hit "Too Old to Cut the Mustard" and successfully revitalizing Dietrich's image for a new audience.

== Track listing ==
Side A
No.	Title	Writer(s)	Length
1.	"Dot's Nice – Donna Fight!"	Showalter, Bagdasarian
2.	"It's the Same"	R. Wright, G. Forrest

Side B
No.	Title	Writer(s)	Length
1.	"Too Old to Cut the Mustard"	B. Carlisle
2.	"Good for Nothin'"	Engvick, Wilder

== Personnel ==
From the original Columbia Records labels:

- Rosemary Clooney – vocals
- Marlene Dietrich – vocals
- Stan Freeman – harpsichord
- Frank Carroll – bass
- Terry Snyder – drums
- Mundell Lowe – guitar (on "Too Old to Cut the Mustard")
- Sal Salvador – guitar (on "Too Old to Cut the Mustard")
- Vincent Ryerson – guitar (on "Dot's Nice – Donna Fight!", "It's the Same")
- Tony Caiola – guitar (on "Dot's Nice – Donna Fight!", "It's the Same")
- Jimmy Carroll – orchestration and conductor
