= Here's to My Lady =

Studio album by Rosemary Clooney
- Released: 1978
- Recorded: September 1978
- Genre: Vocal jazz
- Length: 40:59
- Label: Concord Jazz
- Producer: Carl Jefferson

Rosemary Clooney chronology
Rosie Sings Bing (1978)	Here's to My Lady (1978)	Rosemary Clooney Sings the Lyrics of Ira Gershwin (1979)

Professional ratings
Review scores
Source	Rating
AllMusic	4.5/5 stars
The Rolling Stone Album Guide	3/5 stars
DownBeat	4/5 stars

Here's to My Lady is a 1978 studio album by the American jazz singer Rosemary Clooney, recorded in tribute to Billie Holiday.

== Track listing ==
1. "I Cover the Waterfront" (Johnny Green, Edward Heyman) – 3:35
2. "Good Morning Heartache" (Ervin Drake, Dan Fisher, Irene Higginbotham) – 4:19
3. "Mean to Me" (Fred E. Ahlert, Roy Turk) – 3:46
4. "Lover Man (Oh Where Can You Be?)" (Jimmy Davis, Ram Ramirez, James Sherman) – 4:32
5. "Don't Explain" (Arthur Herzog, Jr., Billie Holiday) – 4:44
6. "Comes Love" (Lew Brown, Sam H. Stept, Charles Tobias) – 4:46
7. "He's Funny That Way" (Neil Moret, Richard A. Whiting) – 4:38
8. "God Bless the Child" (Herzog, Holiday) – 2:24
9. "Them There Eyes" (Maceo Pinkard, Doris Tauber, William Tracey) – 2:35
10. "Everything Happens to Me" (Tom Adair, Matt Dennis) – 5:30

== Personnel ==
=== Performance ===
- Rosemary Clooney – vocal
- Cal Collins – guitar
- Scott Hamilton – tenor saxophone
- Warren Vaché – cornet
- Nat Pierce – piano
- Monty Budwig – double bass
- Jake Hanna – drums
