= Everything's Coming Up Rosie =

Studio album by Rosemary Clooney
- Released: 1977
- Recorded: July 7, 1977
- Genre: Jazz
- Length: 51:10
- Label: Concord
- Producer: Carl Jefferson

Rosemary Clooney chronology
A Tribute to Duke (1977)	Everything's Coming Up Rosie (1977)	Rosie Sings Bing (1978)

Professional ratings
Review scores
Source	Rating
Allmusic	4/5 stars

Everything's Coming Up Rosie is a 1977 studio album by the American jazz singer Rosemary Clooney. It was the first solo album that Clooney released on Concord Records. The title is a reference to the 1959 song "Everything's Coming up Roses". On the album, Clooney is accompanied by a quintet of jazz musicians. The album marked the beginning of a fifteen-year recording and performance partnership with tenor saxophonist Scott Hamilton.

== Background ==
Everything's Coming Up Rosie followed two albums recorded in 1975-1976 for United Artists. The United Artist records featured country and contemporary popular songs, and were an attempt to revive Clooney's career after several years outside of the music industry. Neither of the United Artists records were financially successful, and Clooney was dropped from the label. Signing with Concord, an independent label that specialized in mainstream swing and jazz, Clooney began working in a small-group swing setting, singing mostly traditional pop standards. Clooney would record a further twenty-five albums for Concord, with her last being released a year before her death in 2002.

== Track listing ==
1. "I Cried for You" (Gus Arnheim, Arthur Freed, Abe Lyman) – 3:00
2. "More Than You Know" (Edward Eliscu, Billy Rose, Vincent Youmans) – 3:41
3. "How Am I to Know?" (Jack King, Dorothy Parker) – 4:04
4. "I Can't Get Started" (Vernon Duke, Ira Gershwin) – 3:38
5. "A Foggy Day" (George Gershwin, Ira Gershwin) – 2:57
6. "I've Got a Crush on You" (George Gershwin, Ira Gershwin) – 3:23
7. "Hey There" (Richard Adler, Jerry Ross) – 2:40
8. "As Time Goes By" (Herman Hupfeld) – 4:02
9. "All of Me" (Gerald Marks, Seymour Simons) – 5:52
10. "Do You Know What It Means to Miss New Orleans?" (Louis Alter, Eddie DeLange) – 3:32

== Personnel ==
- Rosemary Clooney – vocal
- Bill Berry – trumpet
- Scott Hamilton – tenor saxophone
- Nat Pierce – piano
- Monty Budwig – double bass
- Jake Hanna – drums
