= Rosemary Clooney Sings Ballads =

Studio album by Rosemary Clooney
- Released: 1985
- Recorded: 1985
- Genre: Jazz
- Length: 42:17
- Label: Concord
- Producer: John Burk

Rosemary Clooney chronology
Rosemary Clooney Sings the Music of Irving Berlin (1984)	Rosemary Clooney Sings Ballads (1985)	Rosemary Clooney Sings the Music of Jimmy Van Heusen (1986)

Professional ratings
Review scores
Source	Rating
Allmusic	2.5/5 stars

Rosemary Clooney Sings Ballads is a 1985 album by Rosemary Clooney.

== Track listing ==
1. "Thanks for the Memory" (Ralph Rainger, Leo Robin) – 5:00
2. "Here's That Rainy Day" (Johnny Burke, Jimmy Van Heusen) – 3:41
3. "The Shadow of Your Smile" (Johnny Mandel, Paul Francis Webster) – 5:28
4. "A Nightingale Sang in Berkeley Square" (Eric Maschwitz, Manning Sherwin, Jack Strachey) – 3:13
5. "Bewitched, Bothered and Bewildered" (Lorenz Hart, Richard Rodgers) – 4:33
6. "Days of Wine and Roses" (Henry Mancini, Johnny Mercer) – 4:04
7. "Easy Living" (Rainger, Robin) – 4:26
8. "Spring Is Here" (Hart, Rodgers) – 3:29
9. "Why Shouldn't I?" (Cole Porter) – 4:47
10. "It Never Entered My Mind" (Hart, Rodgers) – 4:10

== Personnel ==
- Rosemary Clooney – vocals
- Warren Vaché Jr. – cornet
- Scott Hamilton – tenor saxophone
- John Oddo – piano
- Ed Bickert – guitar
- Chris Flory – guitar
- Chuck Israels – double bass
- Jake Hanna – drums
