= Thanks for Nothing (Rosemary Clooney album) =

Studio album by Rosemary Clooney
- Released: 1964
- Recorded: 1964
- Genre: Vocal jazz
- Label: Reprise
- Producer: Sonny Burke

Rosemary Clooney chronology
Love (1963)	Thanks for Nothing (1964)	That Travelin' Two-Beat (1965)

Professional ratings
Review scores
Source	Rating
Allmusic	3/5 stars

Thanks for Nothing is a 1964 studio album by American jazz singer Rosemary Clooney.

As the sole album that Clooney recorded for Reprise Records, Thanks for Nothing would mark Clooney's last solo studio work until 1976's Look My Way.

== Track listing ==
1. "Hello Faithless" (Felice and Boudleaux Bryant) – 2:19
2. "The Rules of the Road" (Cy Coleman, Carolyn Leigh) – 2:34
3. "Just One of Those Things" (Cole Porter) – 2:32
4. "All Alone" (Irving Berlin) – 2:27
5. "Black Coffee" (Sonny Burke, Paul Francis Webster) – 3:43
6. "A Good Man Is Hard to Find" (Eddie Green) – 2:28
7. "Baby, the Ball Is Over" (Alan Bergman, Marilyn Keith, Lew Spence) – 2:11
8. "The Man That Got Away" (Harold Arlen, Ira Gershwin) – 4:16
9. "I Gotta Right to Sing the Blues" (Arlen, Ted Koehler) – 3:16
10. "Miss Otis Regrets" (Porter) – 3:03
11. "Thanks for Nothing (At All)" (Jerry Gladstone, John Rotella) – 3:06
12. "Careless Love" (W.C. Handy, Martha E. Koenig, Spencer Williams) – 2:07

== Personnel ==
=== Performance ===
- Rosemary Clooney – vocal
- Bob Thompson – arranger, conductor
