= With Love (Rosemary Clooney album) =

Studio album by Rosemary Clooney
- Released: 1981
- Recorded: November 1980
- Genre: Jazz, vocal jazz
- Length: 39:47
- Label: Concord
- Producer: John Burk

Rosemary Clooney chronology
| Rosemary Clooney Sings the Lyrics of Ira Gershwin (1979) | With Love (1981) | Rosemary Clooney Sings the Music of Cole Porter (1982) |

Professional ratings
Review scores
| Source | Rating |
|---|---|
| AllMusic | 3/5 stars |

With Love is a studio album by Rosemary Clooney released in 1981 on Concord Records. Unlike many of her Concord albums, it mixes contemporary pop (from writers like Billy Joel, Melissa Manchester, and Marvin Hamlisch) with traditional pop standards. On the LP, the A-side features four contemporary pop songs, while the B-side is a more typical jazz and cabaret set featuring a bossa nova, two Broadway theater standards, and two 1940s pop standards.

== Track listing ==
1. "Just the Way You Are" (Billy Joel) – 5:11
2. "The Way We Were" (Alan Bergman, Marilyn Bergman, Marvin Hamlisch) – 5:04
3. "Alone at Last" (Phil Cody, Neil Sedaka) – 4:57
4. "Come in from the Rain" (Melissa Manchester, Carole Bayer Sager) – 4:53
5. "Meditation" (Norman Gimbel, Antônio Carlos Jobim, Newton Mendonça) – 4:47
6. "Hello, Young Lovers" (Oscar Hammerstein II, Richard Rodgers) – 3:50
7. "Just in Time" (Betty Comden, Adolph Green, Jule Styne) – 3:20
8. "Tenderly" (Walter Gross, Jack Lawrence) – 5:11
9. "Will You Still Be Mine?" (Tom Adair, Matt Dennis) – 3:04

== Personnel ==
- Rosemary Clooney – vocals
- Scott Hamilton - tenor saxophone
- Warren Vache - cornet and flugelhorn
- Cal Tjader - vibraphone
- Nat Pierce - piano
- Cal Collins - guitar
- Bob Maize - bass
- Jake Hanna -drums
