= Rosemary Clooney Sings the Lyrics of Ira Gershwin =

Studio album by Rosemary Clooney
- Released: October 1979
- Recorded: 1979
- Genre: Vocal jazz
- Length: 42:11
- Label: Concord
- Producer: John Burk

Rosemary Clooney chronology
Here's to My Lady (1978)	Rosemary Clooney Sings the Lyrics of Ira Gershwin (1979)	With Love (1980)

Professional ratings
Review scores
Source	Rating
Allmusic	3/5 stars

Rosemary Clooney Sings the Lyrics of Ira Gershwin is a 1979 album by Rosemary Clooney, of songs with lyrics by Ira Gershwin.

== Track listing ==
1. "But Not for Me" – 5:47
2. "Nice Work If You Can Get It" – 2:58
3. "How Long Has This Been Going On?" – 4:58
4. "Fascinating Rhythm" – 2:56
5. "Love Is Here to Stay" – 3:48
6. "Strike Up the Band" – 3:46
7. "Long Ago (and Far Away)" (Jerome Kern) – 4:24
8. "They All Laughed" – 4:05
9. "The Man that Got Away" (Harold Arlen) – 6:00
10. "They Can't Take That Away from Me" – 3:29

All lyrics by Ira Gershwin, all music by George Gershwin, other composers noted.

== Personnel ==
- Rosemary Clooney - vocal
- Scott Hamilton - tenor saxophone
- Warren Vaché - cornet, flugelhorn
- Roger Glenn - flute
- Cal Collins - guitar
- Nat Pierce - piano
- Chris Amberger - double bass
- Jeff Hamilton - drums
