= A Touch of Tabasco =

Studio album by Rosemary Clooney and Pérez Prado
- Released: 1959
- Recorded: July 30–31, August 15, 1959
- Genre: Jazz
- Length: 27:07
- Label: RCA Victor

Rosemary Clooney and Pérez Prado chronology
Hymns from the Heart (1959)	A Touch of Tabasco (1959)	Hollywood Hits (1959)

Professional ratings
Review scores
Source	Rating
Allmusic	4/5 stars

A Touch of Tabasco is a 1959 studio album released by RCA Victor featuring the American jazz singer Rosemary Clooney and the Cuban band leader Pérez Prado.

This was the only album that Clooney and Prado recorded together; the album was promoted with free bottles of Tabasco sauce.

The liner notes were contributed by Clooney's husband, the actor José Ferrer.

== Track listing ==
1. "Corazón de Melón" (Rigual, Traditional) - 2:06
2. "Like a Woman" (Frank Loesser) - 2:06
3. "I Only Have Eyes for You" (Al Dubin, Harry Warren) - 2:11
4. "Magic Is the Moonlight" (Grever, Pasquale) - 2:39
5. "In a Little Spanish Town" (Sam M. Lewis, Mabel Wayne, Victor Young) - 2:08
6. "Sway" (Norman Gimbel, Luiz Ruiz) - 2:42
7. "Mack the Knife" (Marc Blitzstein, Bertolt Brecht, Kurt Weill) - 2:03
8. "Bali Ha'i" (Oscar Hammerstein II, Richard Rodgers) - 2:30
9. "You Do Something to Me" (Cole Porter) - 1:36
10. "Cucurrucucu Paloma" (Mendez) - 2:36
11. "I Got Plenty o' Nuttin''" (George Gershwin, Ira Gershwin, DuBose Heyward) - 2:16
12. "Adiós" (Madriguera, Woods) - 2:14

== Personnel ==
- Rosemary Clooney – vocal
- Pérez Prado – arranger, conductor
