= Swing Around Rosie =

Studio album by Rosemary Clooney
- Released: 1959
- Recorded: December 26, 1958
- Length: 54:06
- Label: Coral

Rosemary Clooney chronology
Story of Celeste (1957)	Swing Around Rosie (1959)	Fancy Meeting You Here (1959)

Professional ratings
Review scores
Source	Rating
AllMusic	2/5 stars
The Encyclopedia of Popular Music	4/5 stars

Swing Around Rosie is a 1959 studio album by Rosemary Clooney, accompanied by the Buddy Cole trio.

== Track listing ==
1. "'Deed I Do" (Walter Hirsch, Fred Rose) – 1:49
2. "You Took Advantage of Me" (Lorenz Hart, Richard Rodgers) – 2:24
3. "Blue Moon" (Hart, Rodgers) – 2:27
4. "Sing, You Sinners" (Sam Coslow, W. Franke Harling) – 2:16
5. "A Touch of the Blues" (Don George, Eddie Wilcox) – 2:43
6. "Goody Goody" (Matty Malneck, Johnny Mercer) – 2:07
7. "Too Close for Comfort" (Jerry Bock, Larry Holofcener, George David Weiss) – 2:39
8. "Do Nothin' Till You Hear from Me" (Duke Ellington, Bob Russell) – 2:49
9. "Moonlight Mississippi (A Whistle Stop Town)" (Willard Robison) – 2:36
10. "I Wish I Were in Love Again" (Hart, Rodgers) – 2:23
11. "Sunday in Savannah" (Hugh Mackay) – 2:31
12. "This Can't Be Love" (Hart, Rodgers) – 2:06

== Personnel ==
=== Performance ===
- Rosemary Clooney – vocal
- The Buddy Cole trio
