= Cal Collins =

American jazz guitarist

- Born: May 5, 1933; Medora, Indiana, U.S.
- Died: August 27, 2001 (aged 68) Dillsboro, Indiana
- Genres: Jazz, swing
- Occupation: Musician
- Instrument: Guitar
- Label: Concord Jazz
- Formerly of: Benny Goodman

Cal Collins (May 5, 1933 – August 27, 2001) was an American jazz guitarist.

Born in Medora, Indiana, United States, Collins first played the mandolin professionally as a bluegrass musician in the early 1950s. After service in the Army, he moved to Cincinnati, Ohio, and switched to jazz guitar after hearing swing guitarists Charlie Christian, Irving Ashby, and Oscar Moore. He played in Cincinnati for twenty years.

His first recording was on the Airtown label, a 45 rpm, #JB2006 that was released in 1968. One side features a Jazzed version of Duane Eddy's "Forty Miles of Bad Road", the other side of the recording features a version of the Santo & Johnny hit, "Sleep Walk" combined into a medley with "Peg o' My Heart".

Benny Goodman hired him in 1976 at the age of 43. He spent three years with the Goodman orchestra and then three years making albums for Concord Jazz. As a leader and sideman, he worked with Scott Hamilton, Warren Vache, Rosemary Clooney, Ross Tompkins, Woody Herman, John Bunch, and Marshal Royal.

In the early 1980s, Collins returned to Cincinnati and slowed down his career. He joined the Masters of the Steel String Guitar Tour in 1993 with Jerry Douglas and Doc Watson and recorded his last album in 1998. In 2001, he died of liver failure.

== Discography ==
=== As leader ===
- Cal Collins in San Francisco (Concord Jazz, 1978)
- Ohio Boss Guitar with John Bunch, Carmen Leggio (Famous Door, 1978)
- Cincinnati to L.A. (Concord Jazz, 1978)
- Blues on My Mind (Concord Jazz, 1979)
- By Myself (Concord Jazz, 1980)
- Interplay with Herb Ellis (Concord Jazz, 1981)
- Cross Country (Concord Jazz, 1981)
- Tour de Force with Scott Hamilton, Jake Hanna, Dave McKenna (Concord Jazz, 1981)
- Milestones (Pausa, 1984)
- Crack'd Rib (Mo Pro, 1985)
- Just Friends with Frank Vincent (Mo Pro, 1986)
- Ohio Style (Concord Jazz, 1991)

=== As sideman ===
With John Bunch

- Slick Funk (Famous Door, 1978)
- Jubilee (Audiophile, 1984)

With Rosemary Clooney

- Here's to My Lady (Concord Jazz, 1979)
- Rosemary Clooney Sings the Lyrics of Ira Gershwin (Concord Jazz, 1979)
- With Love (Concord Jazz, 1981)
- Rosemary Clooney Sings the Music of Cole Porter (Concord Jazz, 1982)

With Concord Jazz All Stars

- Concord Jazz All Stars at the Northsea Jazz Festival Volume 1 (Concord Jazz, 1982)
- Concord Jazz All Stars at the Northsea Jazz Festival Volume 2 (Concord Jazz, 1983)
- Duke Meets Concord Jazz All Stars (Toshiba, 1996)

With Concord Super Band

- In Tokyo (Concord Jazz, 1979)
- Concord Super Band II (Concord Jazz, 1980)

With Benny Goodman

- Live at Carnegie Hall 40th Anniversary Concert (London, 1978)
- The King (Century, 1978)

With Woody Herman

- Presents a Concord Jam Volume 1 (Concord Jazz, 1981)
- A Great American Evening Vol. 3 (Concord Jazz, 1983)
- We (Eastworld 1983)

With Eiji Kitamura

- Dear Friends (Concord Jazz, 1980)
- No Count (Concord Jazz, 1983)

With Marshal Royal

- First Chair (Concord Jazz, 1979)
- Royal Blue (Concord, 1980)

With Warren Vache

- Jillian (Concord Jazz, 1979)
- Polished Brass (Concord Jazz, 1979)

With others

- Bob Barnard, New York Notes (Sackville, 1996)
- Cal Collins, Michael Moore, Jimmy Madison, and Kenny Poole, S'Us Four (J-Curve, 1998)
- Scott Hamilton, Scott Hamilton 2 (Concord Jazz, 1978)
- Scott Hamilton and Buddy Tate, Scott's Buddy (Concord Jazz, 1981)
- Hank Marr, Hank & Frank (Double-Time, 1998)
- Ross Tompkins, Concord All Stars, Festival Time (Concord Jazz, 1980)
