= Red Garters (film) =

1954 film by George Marshall

- Film poster
- Directed by: George Marshall
- Written by: Michael Fessier
- Produced by: Pat Duggan
- Starring: Rosemary Clooney; Jack Carson; Guy Mitchell
- Cinematography: Arthur Arling
- Edited by: Arthur P. Schmidt
- Music by: Joseph J. Lilley
- Color process: Technicolor
- Production company: Paramount Pictures
- Distributed by: Paramount Pictures
- Release dates: February 9, 1954 (Los Angeles); March 26, 1954 (New York City)
- Running time: 91 minutes
- Country: United States
- Language: English
- Box office: $1.3 million

Red Garters is a 1954 American musical Western film starring Rosemary Clooney, Jack Carson, Guy Mitchell. It is a musical spoof of Westerns. The director was George Marshall.

The film was nominated for an Academy Award for Best Art Direction (Hal Pereira, Roland Anderson, Samuel M. Comer, Ray Moyer).

"[Red Garters] is a costume piece, a roguish, cheeky musical western in which anything goes. All the cliches of every western ever made are examined with humor and high spirits. [...] Red Garters has no settings in the ordinary sense; houses, trees, windows and the like are merely suggested, as on a musical stage."

It has been distributed on VHS, Laserdisc, and DVD.

== Plot ==
A stranger in town meets pretty young Susan Martinez De La Cruz and accompanies her to a barbecue, where wealthy Jason Carberry is saying a few words for the recently departed Robin Randall, a citizen who got shot.

Jason objects to the stranger's presence, being Susan's guardian and protective of her. He challenges him to a shootout, but the stranger pulls his pistol before Jason's can even clear the holster. Calaveras Kate, a saloon singer who's in love with Jason, is relieved when the stranger declines to pull the trigger.

Rafael Moreno suddenly rides into town and picks a fight with the stranger. Their brawl continues until the arrival of Judge Wallace Wintrop and his niece, Sheila, who have come to town from back East and deplore all this random violence out West.

The stranger is recognized as Reb Randall, the dead man's brother. He is looking for the killer, who could be Rafael, or could be Jason, or could even be Billy Buckett, the coward of the county. The women hold their breath to see if the men they love will survive.

== Cast ==
- Rosemary Clooney as Calaveras Kate
- Jack Carson as Jason Carberry
- Guy Mitchell as Reb Randall
- Pat Crowley as Susan Martinez De La Cruz
- Gene Barry as Rafael Moreno
- Cass Daley as Minnie Redwing
- Frank Faylen as Billy Buckett
- Reginald Owen as Judge Wallace Winthrop
- Buddy Ebsen as Ginger Pete
- Richard Hale as Dr. J. Pott Troy
- Joanne Gilbert as Sheila Winthrop
- Herb Golden as Townsman

== Songs ==
The songs were written by Jay Livingston and Ray Evans — a team that won three Academy Awards. The soundtrack on Columbia Records was released as a ten-inch Lp combining soundtrack recordings with studio re-creations conducted by Percy Faith and Mitch Miller.

Selections include:

- Red Garters - Clooney
- A Dime and a Dollar - Mitchell
- Brave Man - Clooney
- This is Greater Than I Thought - Gilbert
- Good Intentions - Clooney
- Meet a Happy Guy - Mitchell
- Bad News - Clooney
- Man and Woman - Clooney and Mitchell

After being out-of-print for more than 40 years, Collectables re-released the album on CD paired with Clooney's ten-inch album of songs from White Christmas.
