= Look My Way (Rosemary Clooney album) =

Studio album by Rosemary Clooney
- Released: 1976
- Studio: RCA Victor Studios, Nashville, Tennessee
- Genre: Traditional pop, country
- Label: United Artists
- Producer: Scott Turner

Rosemary Clooney chronology
That Travelin' Two-Beat (1965)	Look My Way (1976)	Nice to Be Around (1977)

Look My Way was a 1976 studio album by Rosemary Clooney. The songs include a number of country tracks, and a remake of her early hit "Half as Much".

Look My Way marked Clooney's first solo work since 1964's Thanks for Nothing. In the late 1960s, Clooney suffered a nervous breakdown, and halted her performing and recording career for several years. Her return to recording in 1976 marked the beginning of her music career comeback, which would last until her death in 2002.

== Track listing ==
1. "Half as Much" (Curley Williams)
2. "Roses in the Garden" (Bill Mumy, Paul Gordon)
3. "When Will I Be Loved?" (Phil Everly)
4. "Storms Never Last" (Jessi Colter)
5. "Look My Way" (Julia Marsh, K.E. Marsh)
6. "'Twas a Sunny Day" (Paul Simon)
7. "There I've Said It" (Margo Smith)
8. "I'm Not Lisa" (Jessi Colter)
9. "Don't the Good Times (Make It All Worth While)" (Charlie Williams, Fred Koller)
10. "Singing the Blues" (Melvin Endsley)
11. "When You Got Love" (Don Gibson)
12. "The Very Thought of Losing You" (Don Gibson)

The album was combined with the 1977 Clooney album Nice to Be Around in a compact disc released by EMI-Capitol in 2002.

== Personnel ==
- Rosemary Clooney - vocals
- Dale Sellers, David Kirby, Harold Bradley, Jerry Shook - guitar
- Roy "Junior" Huskey - bass
- Buddy Emmons - steel guitar
- Hargus "Pig" Robbins - piano
- Larrie Londin - drums
- Buddy Spicher, Johnny Gimble, Wade Ray - strings
- The Jordanaires - vocals

Technical

- Chuck Seitz - engineer
