= That Travelin' Two-Beat =

Studio album by Bing Crosby and Rosemary Clooney
- Released: 1965
- Recorded: August, December 1964
- Genre: Vocal pop, vocal jazz
- Label: Capitol
- Producer: Simon Rady

Bing Crosby chronology
Bing Crosby Sings the Great Country Hits (1965)	That Travelin' Two-Beat (1965)	The Summit (w/ Dean Martin, Frank Sinatra and Sammy Davis Jr.) (1966)

Rosemary Clooney chronology
Thanks for Nothing (1965)	That Travelin' Two-Beat (1965)	Look My Way (1976)

Professional ratings
Review scores
Source	Rating
Allmusic	3/5 stars

That Travelin' Two-Beat is a duet album by Bing Crosby and Rosemary Clooney recorded in 1964 and released on Capitol Records in 1965.

With its world tour theme, it was a revisitation of the concept explored in the duo's acclaimed RCA Victor album, Fancy Meeting You Here, released in 1958. That album had been arranged by Billy May, and he was called upon again to write the charts for this sequel.

As its title implies, the album took popular songs from around the world, but then set them all to Dixieland two-beat arrangements. The songwriters Jay Livingston and Ray Evans supplied the title track and added new lyrics and countermelodies to the other, more-established songs.

Crosby and Clooney were friends, who often performed together on television, radio and stage. That Travelin' Two-Beat was re-released on CD in 2001 on the Collectors' Choice label, combined with another Crosby album from 1965 (this time without Clooney), Bing Crosby Sings the Great Country Hits.

== Reception ==
Variety commented: "This parlay of Bing Crosby and Rosemary Clooney results in fair session of Dixieland music pegged to a musical Cook’s tour. While the sound is traditional, the repertoire is definitely offbeat, setting some surprising material into a two-beat format. The duo works with some amusing ideas in the title song, “Knees Up, Mother,” “Roamin’ in the Gloamin’,” “The Daughter of Molly Malone,” “The Poor People of Paris” and “I Get Ideas,” plus a takeout on a Strauss waltz, “New Vienna Woods.” This was the last session produced by Capitol's A & R Executive, the late Si Rady."

Record producer, Ken Barnes, wrote: "This second album, teaming Bing with the delightful Rosemary Clooney, is far less sophisticated than the 1958 classic Fancy Meeting You Here (RCA), but it is enjoyable nonetheless. Like the previous album, Crosby and Clooney have decided to retain the “travel” theme—with songs like “Poor People of Paris,” “Roamin’ in the Gloamin’,” and a clever, up-dated variation of Strauss’s “New Vienna Woods.” The only shortcoming—and with twelve songs it is a considerable one—is that everything is tied to a two-beat Dixieland format. Despite these limitations, Billy May's tongue-in-cheek backings raise a smile or two. The adaptations and lyrics by Jay Livingston and Ray Evans are very effective. Miss Clooney responds happily to Bing's bouncy phrasing. If the treatments had been a little more varied and the sound balancing a shade more sympathetic to the voices, this could have been just as good as Fancy."

In Ken Crossland's and Malcolm Macfarlane's book about Rosemary Clooney, Late life Jazz, they reviewed the album saying: "So, the old firm of Crosby and Clooney went to work late in 1964 and over three sessions, recorded That Travellin’ Two-Beat. The album lifted much from its predecessor from six years before. It had the same theme, travel, and the same arranger (Billy May) and where the first had been the brainchild of one songwriting partnership (Cahn and Van Heusen), Two-Beat relied on another pairing, that of Jay Livingston and Ray Evans. The result was a spirited and lively album but, as with many follow-ups, one that never quite matched the original. Livingston and Evans composed some new material, including the title track, as well as providing some updated lyrics for some of the older material that Bing and Rosemary chose to include. Thus, the 1883 song about a Dublin fishmonger, “Molly Malone” became an updated “Daughter of Molly Malone”. A classical piece, Johann Strauss's “Tales from the Vienna Woods” became the “New Vienna Woods”, whilst the Latin standard “Cielito Lindo”” became “Adios, Senorita”.

Critical response to the album was lukewarm and few reviewers thought that it matched its predecessor. Some said the Livingston and Evans re-workings were too elaborate and complicated. Others thought that May's typically bombastic arrangements, complete with bells and whistles, owed more to a marching band or circus act than it did to the purported Dixieland theme. Perhaps the greatest difference however was in the duet performances of Bing and Rosemary. Until the Two-Beat album, they had always appeared as equal partners, working in a genuinely collaborative style. Two-Beat however was Crosby's show. His voice opens virtually every track and makes almost all the running. The reason, it later emerged, was that the duets, like Rosemary's outing with Sinatra the year before, were studio creations. Crosby put down his vocals first with Rosemary filling in the gaps later. The emergence of a rehearsal recording in which Jay Livingston sang Rosemary's part (“You’re very brave, Mr. Livingston,” said Crosby at the end of the session) was the first indication that the duets were spliced together."

== Track listing ==
Side one
No.	Title	Writer(s)	Length
1.	"That Travelin' Two-Beat"	Jay Livingston, Ray Evans	2:28
2.	"New Vienna Woods"	Johann Strauss II, Jay Livingston, Ray Evans	3:25
3.	"Knees Up Mother Brown"	Harris Weston, Bert Lee, Jay Livingston, Ray Evans	2:12
4.	"Roamin' in the Gloamin'"	Gerald Grafton, Harry Lauder	3:00
5.	"Adios Senorita"	Quirino Mendoza y Cortés, Jay Livingston, Ray Evans	3:26
6.	"Come to the Mardi Gras"	Max Bulhoes, Milton DeOliveira, Ervin Drake, Jimmy Shirl	2:45

Side two
No.	Title	Writer(s)	Length
1.	"Hear That Band"	Jay Livingston, Ray Evans	3:15
2.	"The Daughter of Molly Malone"	Jay Livingston, Ray Evans	3:20
3.	"The Poor People of Paris"	Jack Lawrence, Marguerite Monnot, René Rouzaud	2:35
4.	"I Get Ideas"	Dorcas Cochran, Julio César Sanders	2:49
5.	"Ciao, Ciao, Bambina"	Domenico Modugno, Mitchell Parish, Edoardo Verde	3:02
6.	"That Travelin' Two-Beat" (reprise)	Jay Livingston, Ray Evans	1:43
