= Red Garters (album) =

Soundtrack album by Rosemary Clooney, Guy Mitchell, and Joanne Gilbert
- Released: 1954
- Genre: Traditional pop
- Label: Columbia

Guy Mitchell chronology
Red Garters (1954)

Red Garters is an LP album of songs by Rosemary Clooney (and others, especially Guy Mitchell) from the movie of the same name, released by Columbia Records in 1954.

The album was reissued, combined with the 1954 Rosemary Clooney album Irving Berlin's White Christmas, on compact disc by Collectables Records on June 12, 2001.

It received a rating of three and a half stars from AllMusic.

== Track listing ==
All songs are written by Jay Livingston and Ray Evans.

No.	Title	Length
1.	"Red Garters" (featuring Rosemary Clooney and chorus)	2:42
2.	"A Dime and a Dollar" (featuring Guy Mitchell)	2:25
3.	"Brave Man" (featuring Rosemary Clooney)	3:12
4.	"This Is Greater Than I Thought" (featuring Joanne Gilbert)
5.	"Good Intentions" (featuring Rosemary Clooney)	3:05
6.	"Meet a Happy Guy" (featuring Guy Mitchell)
7.	"Bad News" (featuring Rosemary Clooney)	2:07
8.	"Man and Woman" (featuring Rosemary Clooney and Guy Mitchell)	2:43
Total length:		18:14
