= Jake Hanna =

American drummer (1931–2010)

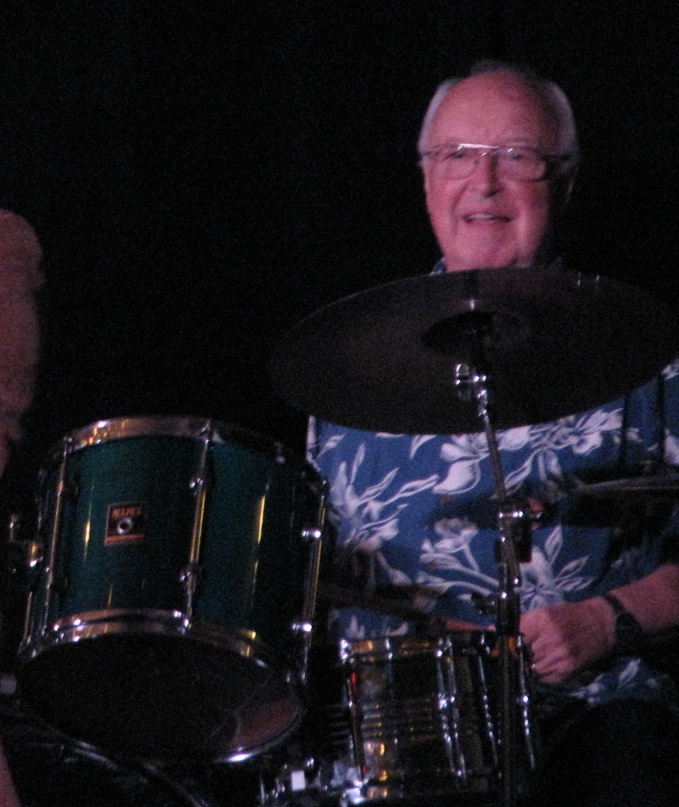
- Hanna at the West Texas Jazz Party, Midland, Texas

Background information
- Born: April 4, 1931; Roxbury, Massachusetts, U.S.
- Died: February 12, 2010 (aged 78) Los Angeles, California, U.S.
- Genres: Jazz
- Occupation: Musician
- Instrument: Drums
- Years active: 1950s–1990s
- Labels: Concord Jazz
- Spouse: Denisa

Jake Hanna (April 4, 1931 – February 12, 2010) was an American jazz drummer.

He was born in Roxbury, Massachusetts, United States. Hanna first performed in Boston, Massachusetts. He was the house drummer at Storyville nightclub in Boston, Massachusetts for a number of years in the 1950s and 1960s. He played with Toshiko Akiyoshi (1957), Maynard Ferguson (1958), Marian McPartland (1959–61), and Woody Herman's Orchestra (1962–64). He appears with the Mort Lindsey Orchestra on Judy Garland's multi Grammy Award-winning live album, Judy at Carnegie Hall (1961). He did extensive work as a studio musician both in and out of jazz, including a period as the drummer for the big band of the Merv Griffin Show (1964–75). He recorded several albums with Carl Fontana for Concord Jazz in the mid-1970s and also played in Supersax. Later in his career he did much work as a sideman for Concord.

Hanna died on February 12, 2010, in Los Angeles, California, of complications from blood disease. He was aged 78.

== Discography ==
=== As leader ===
- Live at Concord (Concord Jazz, 1975)
- Jake Hanna's Kansas City Express (Concord Jazz, 1976)
- Jake Takes Manhattan (Concord Jazz, 1977)
- The Joint Is Jumpin' (Arbors, 1998)

=== As sideman ===
With Toshiko Akiyoshi

- …at Newport (Verve, 1958)
- The Many Sides of Toshiko (Verve, 1975)
- Toshiko's Piano/Amazing Toshiko Akiyoshi (Verve, 1976)
- Finesse (Concord Jazz, 1978)

With Ruby Braff

- It Had to Be Us (Chiaroscuro, 1998)
- Watch What Happens (Arbors, 2002)
- You Brought a New Kind of Love (Arbors, 2004)

With Rosemary Clooney

- Everything's Coming Up Rosie (Concord Jazz, 1977)
- Here's to My Lady (Concord Jazz, 1979)
- With Love (Concord Jazz, 1981)
- Rosemary Clooney Sings the Music of Cole Porter (Concord Jazz, 1982)
- Rosemary Clooney Sings the Music of Harold Arlen (Concord Jazz, 1983)
- Rosemary Clooney Sings Ballads (Concord, 1985)

With Herb Ellis

- Herb Ellis & Ray Brown's Soft Shoe (Concord Jazz, 1974)
- Seven, Come Eleven (Concord Jazz, 1974)
- After You've Gone (Concord Jazz, 1975)
- Rhythm Willie (Concord Jazz, 1975)
- Hot Tracks (Concord Jazz, 1976)
- Soft & Mellow (Concord Jazz, 1979)
- At Montreux Summer 1979 (Concord Jazz, 1980)
- When You're Smiling (Atlas, 1984)
- Roll Call (Justice, 1991)

With Scott Hamilton

- Scott Hamilton Is a Good Wind Who Is Blowing Us No Ill (Concord Jazz, 1977)
- Scott Hamilton 2 (Concord Jazz, 1978)
- No Bass Hit (Concord Jazz, 1979)
- Apples and Oranges (Concord Jazz, 1981)
- Scott's Buddy (Concord Jazz, 1981)
- Tour de Force (Concord Jazz, 1982)
- Major League (Concord Jazz, 1986)
- Groovin' High (Concord Jazz, 1992)

With Woody Herman

- Woody Herman–1963 (Philips, 1963)
- 1963: The Swingin'est Big Band Ever (Philips, 1963)
- Encore (Philips, 1963)
- The Swinging Herman Herd-Recorded Live (Philips, 1964)
- Woody Herman: 1964 (Philips, 1964)
- Woody's Big Band Goodies (Philips, 1965)
- 40th Anniversary Carnegie Hall Concert (RCA Victor, 1977)
- At the Woodchopper's Ball (Koala, 1979)
- Presents a Concord Jam Volume 1 (Concord Jazz, 1981)
- A Great American Evening Vol. 3 (Concord Jazz, 1983)

With Harry James

- The Solid Gold Trumpet of Harry James (MGM, 1962)
- Requests On-the-Road (MGM, 1962)
- Harry James Twenty-fifth Anniversary Album (MGM, 1964)

With Barney Kessel

- Barney Plays Kessel (Concord Jazz, 1975)
- Soaring (Concord Jazz, 1977)
- Poor Butterfly (Concord Jazz, 1977)

With Eiji Kitamura

- Dear Friends (Concord Jazz, 1980)
- Seven Stars (Concord Jazz, 1982)
- No Count (Concord Jazz, 1983)

With Marian McPartland

- Plays Music of Leonard Bernstein (Time, 1960)
- West Side Story (Time, 1964)
- From This Moment On (Concord Jazz, 1979)
- Portrait of Marian McPartland (Concord Jazz, 1979)
- At the Festival (Concord Jazz, 1980)
- Personal Choice (Concord Jazz, 1983)

With Supersax

- Supersax Plays Bird (Capitol, 1973)
- Salt Peanuts (Capitol, 1974)
- Supersax Plays Bird with Strings (Capitol, 1975)
- Chasin' the Bird (MPS, 1977)
- Stone Bird (Columbia, 1988)

With Ross Tompkins

- Lost in the Stars (Concord Jazz, 1977)
- Live at Concord '77 (Concord Jazz, 1978)
- Festival Time (Concord Jazz, 1980)
- Street of Dreams (Famous Door, 1983)
- Symphony (Famous Door, 1984)
- In the Swing of Things (Famous Door, 1987)

With others

- Howard Alden, Swinging into Prominence (Famous Door, 1988)
- Howard Alden & George Van Eps, 13 Strings (Concord Jazz, 1991)
- Dan Barrett, Jubilesta (Arbors, 1992)
- Count Basie, Kansas City 7 (Pablo, 1984)
- Heinie Beau, Midnight Clarinet (Henri, 1984)
- Bill Berry, Hot & Happy (Beez, 1974)
- Ed Bickert, At Toronto's Bourbon Street (Concord Jazz, 1983)
- Ed Bickert, Bye Bye Baby (Concord Jazz, 1984)
- Benny Carter, The King (Pablo, 1976)
- Al Cohn, Nonpareil (Concord Jazz, 1981)
- Cal Collins, Cincinnati to L.A. (Concord Jazz, 1978)
- Cal Collins & Herb Ellis, Interplay (Concord Jazz, 1981)
- Bing Crosby, A Tribute to Duke (Concord Jazz, 1977)
- Barbara Sutton Curtis, Solos & Duets (Sackville, 1994)
- Tal Farlow, On Stage (Concord Jazz, 1981)
- Maynard Ferguson, A Message from Newport (Roulette, 1960)
- Jim Galloway, Kansas City Nights (Sackville, 1993)
- Roberta Gambarini, So in Love (Groovin' High, 2009)
- Terry Gibbs, It's Time We Met Terry Gibbs (Mainstream, 1965)
- Terry Gibbs, Terry Gibbs, Sal Nestico, Nat Pierce, Jake Hanna, Turk Van Lake, Charlie Andrus (Time, 1964)
- Bobby Hackett, The Most Beautiful Horn in the World (Columbia, 1962)
- Dick Johnson, Dick Johnson Plays Alto Sax & Flute & Soprano Sax & Clarinet (Concord Jazz, 1980)
- Plas Johnson, Positively (Concord Jazz, 1976)
- Plas Johnson, The Blues (Concord Jazz, 1976)
- Duke Jordan, Acoustic Live at 3361 Black (3361Black, 1987)
- Richie Kamuca & Lee Konitz, Live at Donte's (Cellar Door, 2010)
- Lawson Haggart Jazz Band, The Legendary Lawson-Haggart Jazz Band (Jazzology, 1990)
- Barbara Lea, You're the Cats! (Audiophile, 1989)
- Warne Marsh, All Music (Nessa, 1976)
- George Masso, The Wonderful World of George Gershwin (Nagel Heyer, 1992)
- George Masso, Trombone Artistry (Nagel Heyer, 1995)
- Dave McKenna, Plays the Music of Harry Warren (Concord Jazz, 1982)
- Abe Most, Swing Low Sweet Clarinet (Camaro, 1984)
- Red Norvo & Ross Tompkins, Red & Ross Recorded Live January 1979 (Concord Jazz, 1979)
- Remo Palmier, Remo Palmier (Concord Jazz, 1979)
- Joe Pass & Ray Brown, Jake Hanna, Herb Ellis, Jazz/Concord (Concord Jazz, 1974)
- Oscar Peterson, Oscar Peterson in Russia (Pablo, 1975)
- Bucky Pizzarelli, Steppin' Out (Swing Out, 2002)
- Sue Raney, In Good Company (Discovery, 1992)
- Spike Robinson, Reminiscin' (Capri, 1992)
- Marshal Royal, First Chair (Concord Jazz, 1979)
- Emily Remler, Firefly (Concord Jazz, 1981)
- Jack Sheldon, Stand by For (Concord Jazz, 1983)
- Louise Tobin & Peanuts Hucko, Tribute to Benny Goodman (Timeless, 1986)
- Bill Watrous & Carl Fontana, Bill Watrous & Carl Fontana (Atlas, 1984)
- Bob Wilber & Ken Davern & Marty Grosz & Ray Brown & Jake Hanna, Soprano Summit in Concert (Concord Jazz, 1976)
- Warren Vache, Jillian (Concord Jazz, 1979)
- Warren Vache, Polished Brass (Concord Jazz, 1979)
- George Van Eps & Howard Alden, Hand Crafted Swing (Concord Jazz, 1992)
- Sarah Vaughan & Woody Herman, 1963 Live Guard Sessions (Jazz Band, 1991)
- Father Tom Vaughn, Joyful Jazz (Concord Jazz, 1976)
- Joe Venuti & George Barnes, Gems (Concord Jazz, 1975)
- Joe Venuti & George Barnes, Live at the Concord Summer Festival (Concord Jazz, 1977)
- George Wein, Newport Jazz Festival All Stars (Atlantic, 1960)
- Kai Winding, The Kai Winding Trombones (From the Jazz Vault, 1979)
- Snooky Young, Horn of Plenty (Concord Jazz, 1979)
