= Fancy Meeting You Here =

Studio album by Bing Crosby and Rosemary Clooney
- Released: 1958
- Recorded: July 28–August 11, 1958
- Genres: Vocal pop, vocal jazz
- Length: 38:11
- Label: RCA Victor
- Producer: Simon Rady

Bing Crosby chronology
Jack B. Nimble – A Mother Goose Fantasy (1958)	Fancy Meeting You Here (1958)	Around the World with Bing! (1958)

Rosemary Clooney chronology
Swing Around Rosie (1958)	Fancy Meeting You Here (1958)	Hymns from the Heart (1959)

Professional ratings
Review scores
Source	Rating
Allmusic	2.5/5 stars

Fancy Meeting You Here is a 1958 studio album of duets by the American singers Bing Crosby and Rosemary Clooney, arranged by Billy May, who also conducted the orchestra. The album was originally issued by RCA Victor in both mono and stereo, catalog numbers LPM/LSP 1854. Fancy Meeting You Here is an early example of a concept album, the 13 songs combining romance and travel with songwriters Sammy Cahn and Jimmy Van Heusen contributing introductory and concluding versions of "Love Won't Let You Get Away" as well as a new song, "Fancy Meeting You Here". Cahn wrote special lyrics to standards like "How About You?" and "I Can't Get Started" that reflected the late 1950s and the personalities of the two singers.

In 1969, the album was reissued on the budget RCA Camden label under the title Rendezvous with a truncated and resequenced track listing and different cover artwork. This reissue eliminated the concept of the original album, and the abridgement, which omitted the first version of "Love Won't Let You Get Away" as well as "Calcutta" and "Isle of Capri," further voided the concept. Following the death of Bing Crosby in October 1977, the 1958 RCA Victor LP was reissued with its original title and artwork with the revised catalog number, AFL1-1854. RCA has reissued both Fancy Meeting You Here and Rendezvous on compact disc on the Bluebird and Camden labels, respectively.

== Critical reception ==
In its review on January 12, 1959, Time magazine called this album, "An infectious musical dialogue between two of the sassiest fancy talkers in the business. C. & C. give slick and witty readings to a selection of retreads — 'On a Slow Boat to China', 'You Came a Long Way from St. Louis' — and introduce a punchy, potential hit named 'Calcutta'. One of the most intriguing vocal entertainments since Noël Coward had his famous chat with Mary Martin."

Variety said, "Two savvy singers team up in a charming rundown of a dozen numbers for a pop set with adult appeal."

Billboard also liked it, saying: "A lot of charm here — A flock of tunes carrying different place names, carrying out the idea of the album title... Cover also carries out the theme. Performances are very smart, with occasional interpolations and asides by Crosby and Clooney. Arranged and conducted in grand style by Billy May."

The British publication The Gramophone in its April 1959 edition went further. "Even so for the duet-warbling of the month I would turn to RCA SF5022 (Mono RD27105): 'Fancy Meeting You Here' with Rosemary Clooney and the old groaner himself, Bing Crosby, bumping amicably into each other in a dozen stage sets scattered around the world...The Billy May accompaniments throughout are first class, and so, obviously, is the singing; but principally it is the infectious easygoing good humor of the record which remains in the mind. That, and an occasional twist of lyric; no record can be neglected which ends a nostalgic and twang-ridden version of the 'Isle of Capri' with 'I've often felt that we both might have stayed there, if it weren't for those stale mandolins.'"

== Track listing ==
=== Original release and 1977 reissue ===
Side one
No.	Title	Writer(s)	Length
1.	"Fancy Meeting You Here"	Sammy Cahn, Jimmy Van Heusen	2:31
2.	"On a Slow Boat to China"	Frank Loesser	2:40
3.	"I Can't Get Started"	Vernon Duke, Ira Gershwin	3:50
4.	"Hindustan"	Oliver Wallace, Harold Weeks	2:53
5.	"It Happened in Monterey"	Billy Rose, Mabel Wayne	2:44
6.	"You Came a Long Way from St. Louis"	John Benson Brooks, Bob Russell	3:07
7.	"Love Won't Let You Get Away"	Sammy Cahn, Jimmy Van Heusen	2:03

Side two
No.	Title	Writer(s)	Length
1.	"How About You?"	Burton Lane, Arthur Freed	3:14
2.	"Brazil"	Ary Barroso, Bob Russell	3:31
3.	"Isle of Capri"	Will Grosz, Jimmy Kennedy	2:40
4.	"Say 'Si Si' (Para Vigo Me Voy)"	Ernesto Lecuona, Francia Luban, Al Stillman	2:22
5.	"Calcutta"	Ray Evans, Jay Livingston	2:55
6.	"Love Won't Let You Get Away" (reprise)	Sammy Cahn, Jimmy Van Heusen	3:41

=== RCA Camden reissue (Rendezvous) 1969 LP and 2000 CD ===
Side one
No.	Title	Writer(s)	Length
1.	"On a Slow Boat to China"	Frank Loesser	2:35
2.	"Hindustan"	Oliver Wallace, Harold Weeks	2:53
3.	"Fancy Meeting You Here"	Sammy Cahn, Jimmy Van Heusen	2:28
4.	"Brazil"	Ary Barroso, Bob Russell	3:28
5.	"You Came a Long Way from St. Louis"	John Benson Brooks, Bob Russell	3:03

Side two
No.	Title	Writer(s)	Length
1.	"How About You?"	Burton Lane, Arthur Freed	3:11
2.	"I Can't Get Started"	Vernon Duke, Ira Gershwin	3:47
3.	"Say 'Si Si' (Para Vigo Me Voy)"	Ernesto Lecuona, Francia Luban, Al Stillman	2:20
4.	"It Happened in Monterey"	Billy Rose, Mabel Wayne	2:40
5.	"Love Won't Let You Get Away"	Sammy Cahn, Jimmy Van Heusen	1:53

=== 2001 Bluebird CD reissue ===
Titles 1–13 are the original album tracks
No.	Title	Writer(s)	Performers	Length
14.	"Ain't A-Hankerin'"	Arthur Altman	Rosemary Clooney and Bob Hope	2:10
15.	"Protection"	Arthur Altman	Rosemary Clooney and Bob Hope	2:37
16.	"Love Won't Let You Get Away"	Sammy Cahn, James Van Heusen	Bing Crosby and Jo Stafford	1:18
17.	"Fancy Meeting You Here" / "On a Slow Boat to China" / "Hindustan" (medley)	Cahn, Van Heusen / Frank Loesser, Oliver Wallace, Harold Weeks	Bing Crosby and Jo Stafford	4:09
18.	"Ol' Man River"	Oscar Hammerstein II, Jerome Kern	Bing Crosby	1:43
19.	"Twilight on the Trail"	Louis Alter, Sidney Mitchell	Bing Crosby	2:01

== Personnel ==
- Bing Crosby – vocal
- Rosemary Clooney
- Billy May – arranger, conductor
