= The Legendary, Lovely Marlene =

Compilation album by Marlene Dietrich
- Released: 1982
- Recorded: 1930s–1960s
- Genre: Traditional pop, cabaret
- Label: MCA

Marlene Dietrich chronology
Just a Gigolo (1979)	The Legendary, Lovely Marlene (1982)	The Best of Marlene Dietrich (1985)

The Legendary, Lovely Marlene is a compilation album by German-American actress and singer Marlene Dietrich, released in May 1982 by MCA Records (catalog no. MCL 1685). It features her complete Decca Records recordings, including her 1940 debut Decca Presents Marlene Dietrich, along with later singles such as "Another Spring, Another Love" and "Kisses Sweeter than Wine".

The title originates from a poem by Noël Coward, who used the phrase when introducing Dietrich’s cabaret debut at London’s Café de Paris on June 21, 1954. The compilation received favorable reviews, earning four and a half stars from AllMusic and three stars from The Encyclopedia of Popular Music. In 1994, the album was released in compact disc (CD) by Music Club titled Marlene – Her 18 Greatest Recordings (catalog no. MCCD178).

== Album details ==
The title of the compilation derives from a poem by Noël Coward, who used the phrase when introducing Dietrich's cabaret debut at London's Café de Paris on June 21, 1954, later documented on her live album At the Café de Paris.

The track listing encompasses the complete set of songs from Dietrich’s period under contract with Decca Records, incorporating all the titles originally released on her debut album with the label, Decca Presents Marlene Dietrich. The songs were recorded in Los Angeles under the direction of conductor Victor Young, with sessions taking place on two separate dates. On December 11, 1939, Dietrich recorded "I’ve Been in Love Before", "You’ve Got That Look," and "Falling in Love Again". Later, on December 19 of the same year, "The Boys in the Backroom", "You Go to My Head" and "You Do Something to Me" were recorded. Additionally, two extra tracks from the reissue titled Marlene Dietrich Souvenir Album were included: "Lili Marleen" and "Symphonie", recorded in New York with the orchestra conducted by Charles Magnante on September 7, 1945.

"Kisses Sweeter than Wine" and its B-side "I May Never Go Home" was one of the tracks included on the album. Released after the Marlene Dietrich album's launch in 1958, the song received a rating of 76 (out of 100) from Billboard magazine, which wrote that they did not see Dietrich's recording as a serious attempt to break into the folk charts, but rather as a fascinating and well-crafted novelty piece. They appreciated her audacity in reinterpreting a popular hit through her unique and "continental" artistic lens (the "gypsy-ish flavor"), and felt that this uniqueness was its greatest asset, deserving of attention from the public and radio stations.

Of the other songs included on the album was the 1957 single, "Another Spring, Another Love" / "Near You" (Dot. catalog no. 15645). Cash Box magazine awarded the single a "B+" for the A-side and a "B" for the B-side. The review praised "Another Spring, Another Love," the theme from the film Witness for the Prosecution (1957), describing it as a "haunting mood number" and predicting it would get "heavy play" on the radio upon the film's release, calling it a "fine first showing" for Dietrich on the Dot label. Regarding the B-side, "Near You", the publication highlighted the innovative approach, noting that the artist "chants the standard against a rock and roll background", resulting in an "interesting coupling that deserves attention". Also included are "This World of Ours" and its B-side "Candles Glowing" released as a single. At the time of the release Billboard praised Dietrich for the exceptional performance of the inspirational ballad, noting that it was likely to receive extensive radio play and strong sales, while also highlighting the B-side.

== Critical reception ==
Professional ratings
Review scores
Source	Rating
AllMusic	4.5/5 stars
The Encyclopedia of Popular Music	3/5 stars

In his 1987 Los Angeles Times column, Alan Eichler highlighted The Legendary, Lovely Marlene as a notable compilation of Marlene Dietric's recordings. He noted that stars like Marilyn Monroe, Mae West, and Marlene Dietrich were included in his survey because their musical abilities were secondary to their other talents, emphasizing that The Legendary, Lovely Marlene showcases Dietrich’s recordings more as a reflection of her persona and screen presence than of professional singing. Eichler praised the collection for including all of her Decca and Dot sessions, noting the presence of unusual tracks never released in the United States, such as the humorous "Near You". Eichler described the compilation as generous, with 18 cuts, and recommended tracking down the British import for the full experience, as the American MCA release was abridged.

== Track listing ==
The Legendary, Lovely Marlene
No.	Title	Writer(s)	Length
1.	"Falling in Love Again"	Friedrich Hollaender, R. Connelly	2:58
2.	"You've Got That Look (That Leaves Me Weak)"	Friedrich Hollaender, Frank Loesser	2:43
3.	"The Boys in the Backroom"	Friedrich Hollaender, Frank Loesser	2:03
4.	"I've Been in Love Before"	Friedrich Hollaender, Frank Loesser	2:38
5.	"You Go to My Head"	J. Fred Coots, Haven Gillespie	3:09
6.	"You Do Something to Me"	Cole Porter	3:00
7.	"Illusions"	Friedrich Hollaender	3:24
8.	"Black Market"	Friedrich Hollaender	3:12
9.	"Lili Marlene"	Norbert Schultze, Hans Leip, Marlene Dietrich	3:26
10.	"Symphonie"	Alstone, André Tabet, Maurice Bernstein	3:05
11.	"Another Spring, Another Love"	Shayne, Paris	2:21
12.	"Near You"	Craig, Goell	2:18
13.	"Kisses Sweeter Than Wine"	Campbell, Newman	3:03
14.	"I May Never Go Home Anymore"	J. Brooks, R. A. Roberts	1:43
15.	"If He Swing by the String"	Addison, More (from Tom Jones)	3:13
16.	"Such Trying Times"	Addison, More (from Tom Jones)	2:57
17.	"Candles Glowing"	Bader, Harrison	2:34
18.	"This World of Ours"	Debout, Couplet, Harrison	2:24
Total length:			50:51

== Personnel ==
Credits adapted from the LP The Legendary, Lovely Marlene (MCA Records – MCL 1685)

- Lacquer Cut by [interlocking JA in run outs] JA
- Liner Notes compiled by Chris Ellis

== See also ==
- Marlene Dietrich discography
