= Marlene Dietrich discography =

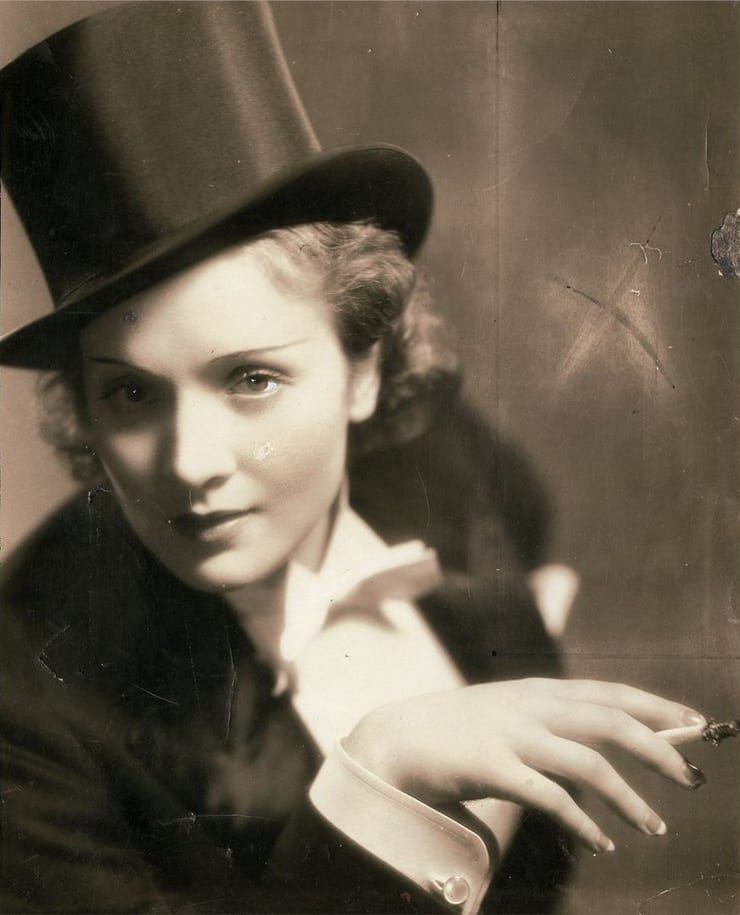
- Studio albums: 4
- Live albums: 4
- Singles: 41
- Video albums: 1

Marlene Dietrich's recording career spanned sixty years, from 1928 until 1988. She introduced the songs "Falling in Love Again (Can't Help It)" (from the film The Blue Angel) and "See What the Boys in the Back Room Will Have" (from Destry Rides Again). She first recorded her version of "Lili Marlene" in 1945.

Her first long-playing album, Marlene Dietrich Overseas, was a prestige success for Columbia Records in 1950. She also recorded several duets with Rosemary Clooney in the early 1950s: these tapped into a younger market and charted. During the 1960s, Dietrich recorded several albums and many singles, mostly with Burt Bacharach at the helm of the orchestra. Dietrich in London, recorded live at the Queen's Theatre in 1964, is an enduring document of Dietrich in concert.

In 1978, Dietrich's performance of the title track from her last film, Just a Gigolo, was issued as a single. She made her last recordings — spoken introductions to songs for a nostalgia album by Udo Lindenberg — from her Paris apartment in 1987.

Dietrich told Maximilian Schell in his documentary, Marlene (1984), that she thought Marlene singt Berlin-Berlin (1964) – her interpretations of Berliner popular songs from the start of the 20th century – was her best album.

== Albums ==
=== Studio albums ===
Title	Album details	Peak chart positions
Title	Album details	GER
Decca Presents Marlene Dietrich (The Souvenir Album)	Released: 1940; Label: Decca Records; Formats: LP	—
Overseas	Released: 1951; Label: Columbia Records; Formats: LP	—
Die neue Marlene	Released: 1965; Label: Electrola; Formats: LP	34
Marlene singt Berlin, Berlin	Released: 1965; Label: Polydor Records; Formats: LP	—

=== Live albums ===
Title	Album details
At the Café de Paris	Released: 1954; Label: Columbia Records; Formats: LP
Dietrich in Rio	Released: 1960; Label: Columbia Records; Formats: LP
Wiedersehen mit Marlene	Released: 1960; Label: Electrola; Formats: LP
Dietrich in London	Released: 1965; Label: Pye Records/Columbia Records; Formats: LP

=== Extended Plays ===
Title	Album details
Rosie and Marlene.	Released: 1953; Label: Columbia Records; Format: LP
Marlène	Released: 1962; Label: La Voix De Son Maître; Format: LP (#EGF 597)

=== Compilation albums ===
Title	Album details	Peak chart positions
Title	Album details	GER
Marlene Dietrich Sings	Released: 1948; Label: Vox Records; Formats: 3 × Shellac, 10"	—
Marlene Dietrich	Released: 1957; Label: Decca Records; Formats: LP	—
The Legendary Marlene Dietrich	Released: 1967; Label: Music for Pleasure; Formats: LP	—
The Magic of Marlene	Released: 1970; Label: Odeon; Formats: LP	—
The Best of Marlene Dietrich	Released: 1973; Label: Columbia Records; Formats: LP	—
Marlene Dietrich in Deutschland	Released: 1976; Label: EMI; Formats: LP	—
Ich Bin Von Kopf Bis Fuß Auf Liebe Eingestellt	Released: 1980; Label: Odeon Records; Formats: LP	—
Marlène	Released: 1981; Label: EMI Electrola; Formats: LP	—
Con Plumas	Released: 1982; Label: EMI Odeon; Formats: LP	—
The Legendary, Lovely Marlene	Released: 1982; Label: MCA Records; Formats: LP	—
The Best of Marlene Dietrich	Released: 1985; Label: EMI Records; Formats: LP	—
The Blue Angel — The Original Recordings	Released: 1990; Label: Pro Arte Digital; Formats: CD	—
The Essential Marlene Dietrich	Released: 1991; Label: Capitol Records; Formats: CD, digital download	—
On Screen, Stage and Radio	Released: 1992; Label: Legend; Formats: CD, digital download	
The Cosmopolitan Marlene Dietrich	—: Released: 1993; Label: Sony Music; Formats: CD	—
Falling in Love Again	Released: 1998; Label: MCA Records; Formats: CD	—
Marlene Dietrich – Legends Of The 20th Century – Original Recordings	Released: 1999; Label: EMI Music; Formats: CD	—
Der Blonde Engel – 25 Lieder	Released: 2001; Label: EMI; Formats: CD	98
Marlene Forever	Released: 2002; Label: Universal Music; Formats: CD	—
Classic: The Universal Masters Collection	Released: 2003; Label: Milan Music; Formats: CD, digital download	—
Love Songs	Released: 2004; Label: Columbia Records; Formats: CD, digital download	—
The Ultimate Collection	Released: 2015; Label: Universal Music Group; Formats: CD, digital download	—
Marlene Dietrich W Warszawie Z Archiwum Polskiego Radia	Released: 2017; Label: Polskie Radio; Formats: CD, digital download	—

=== Box sets ===
Title	Album details
The Magic of Marlene	Released: 1969; Label: Capitol (#DTCR-300); Format: LP
Marlène	Released: 1974; Label: CBS (#CBS 66317); Format: LP
The Legendary Marlene Dietrich	Released: 1978; Label: Columbia Special Products; Formats: LP
Mythos und Legende / Myth and Legend	Released: 1994; Label: EMI Electrola (#8 31420 2); Format: CD
Der Blonde Engel – Die Retrospektive	Released: 2001; Label: Toshiba EMI; Format: CD
Marlene Dietrich	Released: 2022; Label: Electrola (#06024 4821060); Formats: CD, digital download

=== Video albums ===
Title	Album details
An Evening with Marlene Dietrich.	Released: 1986; Label: EMI; Format: VHS, LD

== Other ==
Hermine: Udo Lindenberg singt Lieder von 1929 bis 1988 (* Spoken verse introduction to Illusions and Wenn ich mir was wünschen dürfte)

Many of Dietrich's numerous radio performances have been included on compilations of her music.

The Polish label Wifon issued a cassette tape of a Dietrich concert, recorded in Warsaw in 1966, in 1992 (catalogue number MC283). The release contained the following tracks: "I Can't Give You Anything But Love, Baby", "You're the Cream in my Coffee", "My Blue Heaven", "See What the Boys in the Backroom Will Have", "The Laziest Gal in Town", "Shir Hatan", "La Vie en Rose", "Jonny", "Go 'Way From My Window", "Don't Smoke in Bed", "Lola", "Marie–Marie" and "Frag nicht warum ich gehe".

A limited special edition of the book Photographs and Memories (published in 2001 by Nicolai, Berlin) included a recording of the soundtrack of Dietrich's 1963 filmed concert at Berns Salonger as an audio CD bonus.

The Marlene Dietrich Collection Berlin's archival holdings include soundtrack prerecording discs and unissued radio and concert recordings.

The following of Dietrich's studio recordings remain unreleased: "Du, du liegst mir im Herzen", "Aus der Jugendzeit", "Das zerbrochene Ringlein", "Treue Liebe" (all recorded July 1954 with Jimmy Carroll and orchestra) and "Wot cher! [Knocked 'Em In the Old Kent Road]" (recorded in 1955 with Wally Stott and orchestra).

== Singles: 1928 - 1954 ==
Recordings first issued on 78 rpm records:

Year	Song title (A-Side)	Song title (B-Side)	Label	Catalogue Nr	Notes
1928	"Wenn die beste Freundin"	–	Electrola	EG 892	Duet with Margo Lion and Oskar Karlweis. From Es liegt in der Luft.
1928	"Potpourri from Es liegt in der Luft, Part 1"	"Potpourri from Es liegt in der Luft, Part 2"	Electrola	EH 146	Selections from the revue performed by the cast.
1930	"Falling in Love Again"	"Blonde Women"	HMV	B 3524	From The Blue Angel. Orchestra: Friedrich Hollaender.
1930	"Falling in Love Again"	"Naughty Lola"	Victor	22593	From The Blue Angel. Orchestra: Friedrich Hollaender.
1930	"Ich bin von Kopf bis Fuß auf Liebe eingestellt"	"Nimm dich in Acht vor blonden Frau'n"	Electrola	EG 1770	From Der Blaue Engel. Orchestra: Friedrich Hollaender. Two versions of "Ich bin von Kopf bis Fuß..." were recorded on different dates. Both were issued under the same catalogue number.
1930	"Ich bin die fesche Lola"	"Kinder, heut' abend, da such ich mir was aus"	Electrola	EG 1802	From Der Blaue Engel. Orchestra: Friedrich Hollaender.
1930	"Wenn ich mir was wünschen dürfte"	"Leben ohne Liebe kannst du nicht"	Electrola	EG 2265	From "Der Mann, der seinen Mörder sucht" / "Nie wieder Liebe". Piano: Friedrich Hollaender / Mischa Spoliansky
1931	"Peter"	"Jonny"	Ultraphon	A 887	Orchestra: Peter Kreuder.
1931	"Peter"	"Jonny" (Alternate Version)	Ultraphon	AP 249	Orchestra: Peter Kreuder.
1931	"Quand l'Amour Meurt"	"Give Me the Man"	Electrola	EG 2775	From Morocco. Orchestra: Peter Kreuder.
1933	"Assez"	"Moi, Je M'Ennuie"	Polydor	524180	Orchestra: Peter Kreuder.
1933	"Assez" (Alternate Take)		Decca	M 452	Orchestra: Peter Kreuder.
1933	"Allein in einer grossen Stadt"	"Mein blondes Baby"	Polydor	524181	Orchestra: Peter Kreuder.
1933	"Allein in einer grossen Stadt"	"Mein blondes Baby"	Deutsche Grammophon	25296	Orchestra: Peter Kreuder.
1933	"Ja, so bin ich"	"Wo ist der Mann?"	Polydor	524182	Orchestra: Peter Kreuder. Trumpet: Arthur Briggs.
1933	"Wo ist der Mann?"	"Warum, warum hast dumir weh’ getan" (Sung by Tatjana Birkigt)	Deutsche Grammophon	47002	Orchestra: Peter Kreuder. Trumpet: Arthur Briggs.
1935	"If It Isn't Pain (Then It Isn't Love)"	"Three Sweethearts Have I"	Decca		The Devil is a Woman promotional issue.
1939	"I've Been In Love Before"	"You Do Something To Me"	Decca	23139	Orchestra: Victor Young.
1939	"You've Got that Look"	"You Go To My Head"	Decca	23140	Orchestra: Victor Young.
1939	"Falling in Love Again"	"See What the Boys in the Back Room Will Have"	Decca	23141	Orchestra: Victor Young.
1945	"Lili Marlene"	"Symphonie"	Decca	23456	Orchestra: Charles Magnante.
1948	"Illusions"	"Black Market"	Decca	A14582	From A Foreign Affair.
1952	"Too Old to Cut the Mustard"	"Good for Nothin'"	Columbia	39812	Duets with Rosemary Clooney. Only single to make US pop chart, peaking at No. 12.
1952	"Come Rain or Come Shine"	"Love Me"	Columbia	39797	
1953	"Time For Love"	"Look Me Over Closely"	Columbia	39959	
1953	"Dot's Nice — Donna Fight"	"It's The Same"	Columbia	39980	Duets with Rosemary Clooney.
1953	"Dot's Nice — Donna Fight"	"It's The Same"	Philips	PH 21057	Duets with Rosemary Clooney.
1953	"Besides"	"Land Sea and Air"	Philips	PB 314	Duets with Rosemary Clooney.
1954	"Ich hab' noch einen Koffer in Berlin"	"Peter"	Columbia	40497	

== Singles: 1957 – 1978 ==
Recordings first issued as 7" (45 rpm, except where noted otherwise) singles:

Year	Song title (A-Side)	Song title (B-Side)	Label	Catalogue Nr	Notes
1957	"Near You"	"Another Spring, Another Love"	Dot	15645	Recorded in Los Angeles. Arranged and conducted by Burt Bacharach.
1957	"I May Never Go Home Anymore"	"Kisses Sweeter Than Wine"	Dot	15723	Recorded in Los Angeles. Arranged and conducted by Burt Bacharach.
1958	"This Evening Children"		Electrola	7 EG 1770	From The Blue Angel. Originally recorded in 1930, the English-language version of "Kinder heut' abend..." was first issued in 1958.
1959	"An Interview with Marlene Dietrich"		Columbia	WPSC49788	Promotional issue for Dietrich in Rio backed by album excerpt.
1962	"Cherche la Rose" + "Où Vont Les Fleurs (Where Have All The Flowers Gone)"	"Marie, Marie" + "Déjeuner du Matin"	La Voix de Son Maître	7 EGF 597	Recorded in Paris. Arranged and conducted by Burt Bacharach.
1962	"Sag mir wo die Blumen Sind"	"Die Welt War Jung"	Electrola	E22180	Recorded in Paris. Arranged and conducted by Burt Bacharach.
1963	"Bitte Geh Nicht Fort" "Warum Tut Liebe Weh"	"Für Alles Kommt die Zeit" "Kleine, Treue Nachtigall"	Ariola	40352CU	Arranged and conducted by Burt Bacharach. Dietrich was unhappy with the first issued take of "Bitte Geh Nicht Fort"; at her request the record company used an alternate take for all subsequent pressings.
1963	"Die Antwort weiß ganz allein der Wind"	"Paff, der Zauberdrachen"	Electrola	E22612	Recorded in London. Arranged and conducted by Burt Bacharach.
1964	"Marie–Marie" "Das Lied ist aus"	"Where Have All the Flowers Gone?" "Lola"	Melodia	14217	33⅓ rpm. Live recording from Moscow (May, 1964). Arranged and conducted by Burt Bacharach.
1965	"If He Swings By The String"	"Such Trying Times"	Kapp	HLR9883	
1965	"Where Have All the Flowers Gone?"	"Blowin' in the Wind"	His Master’s Voice	POP 1563	Recorded in London. Arranged and conducted by Burt Bacharach.
1965	"Where Have All the Flowers Gone?"	"Blowin' in the Wind"	Capitol	72474	Recorded in London. Arranged and conducted by Burt Bacharach.
1966	"This World of Ours"	"Candles Glowing"	Decca	45 32076	Recorded in England.
1966	"This World of Ours"	"Candles Glowing"	Pye	7N 17238	Recorded in England.
1966	"Glocken Läuten"	"Still war die Nacht"	Philips	45 346024BF	German versions of "Candles Glowing" and "This World of Ours".
1967	"Where Have All the Flowers Gone"	"Go 'Way From My Window"	Columbia	45 444326	Live recordings. Souvenir issue sold at concerts.
1978	"Just a Gigolo"		Columbia	DB9050	Recorded in Paris. B-side is an orchestral cue from the film soundtrack.

== OSS Recordings (1944–1945) ==
Dietrich recorded the following tracks in Washington in 1944 – 1945 for OSS use:

- "Mein Mann ist verhindert"
- "Sag mir Adieu"
- "Ich hab' die ganze Nacht geweint"
- "Gib doch den Männern am Stammtisch ihr Gift"
- "Wo die Wiesen sind"
- "Fräulein Annie wohnt schon lang nicht hier"
- "Schlittenfahrt"
- "Nun kam die Erntezeit"
- "Du hast 'nen Blick"
- "Ich Heirate Nie"
- "Lili Marleen"

These recordings were not meant for commercial issue. "Gib doch den Männern am Stammtisch ihr Gift", "Ich Heirate Nie" and "Du hast 'nen Blick" were issued for the first time in 2001 on Der Blonde Engel (EMI 7242 5 27567 2 7). All the other tracks remain unissued, with the partial exception of "Lili Marleen". With its massive success on the war front, specifically on the German language OSS MO radio station "Soldatensender", where it became the station's theme song, the song was re-recorded in English and released, with the spelling "Lili Marlene", as a 10" single by Decca in 1945. Though other recordings of the song in German were performed by Dietrich, the original OSS recording of the track is presumed unissued.

== Soundtrack performances (1929–1978) ==
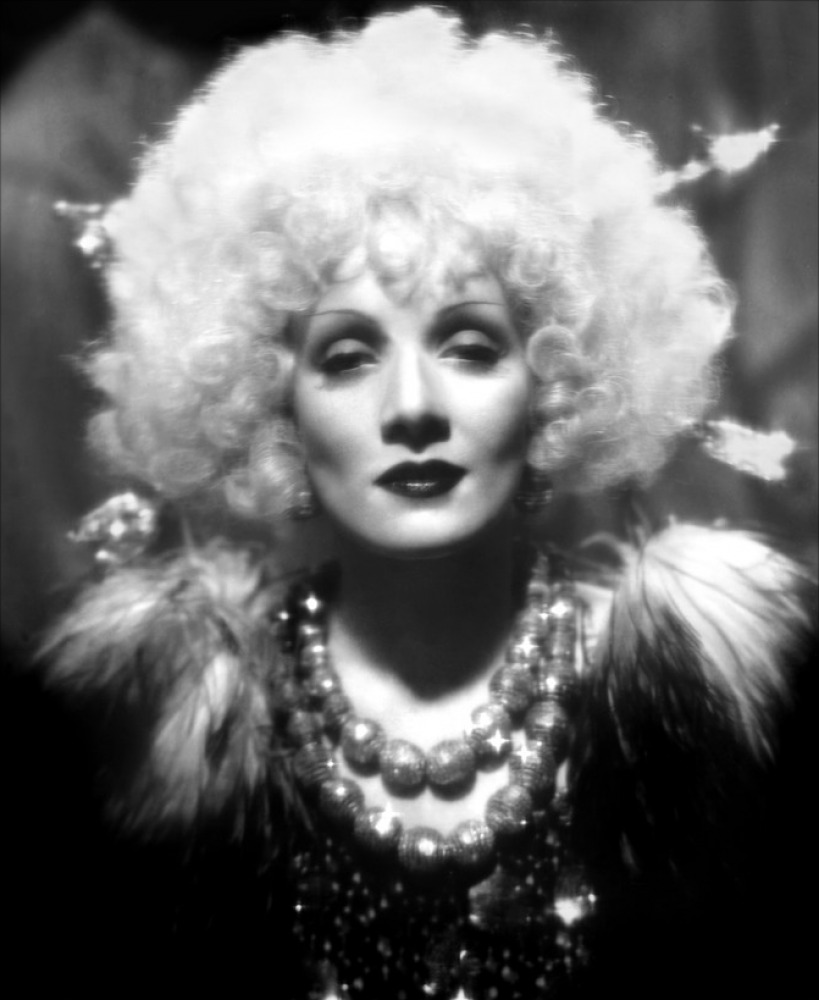
Marlene Dietrich in Blonde Venus (1932)

Many of Dietrich's performances of songs in her films have been included in compilations of her music:

- "You're the Cream in my Coffee" (The Blue Angel Screen Test, 1929)
- "Wer wird denn weinen" (The Blue Angel Screen Test, 1929)
- "Ich bin die fesche Lola" (Der blaue Engel, 1930)
- "Nimm' Dich in acht vor blonden Frau’n" (Der blaue Engel, 1930)
- "Kinder, heut' abend, da such ich mir was aus (Der blaue Engel, 1930)
- "Ich bin von Kopf bis Fuß auf Liebe eingestellt" (Der blaue Engel, 1930)
- "Quand l'amour meurt" (Morocco, 1930)
- "What Am I Bid for my Apple?" (Morocco, 1930)
- "Blonde Women" (The Blue Angel, 1930)
- "Lola" (The Blue Angel, 1930)
- "This Evening, Children" (The Blue Angel, 1930)
- "Falling In Love Again" (The Blue Angel, 1930)
- "Hot Voodoo" (Blonde Venus, 1932)
- "I Couldn’t Be Annoyed" (Blonde Venus, 1932)
- "You Little-So-and-So" (Blonde Venus, 1932)
- "Heidenröslein" (Song of Songs, 1933)
- "Jonny" (Song of Songs, 1933)
- "Three Sweethearts Have I" (The Devil is a Woman, 1935)
- "Awake in a Dream" (Desire, 1936)
- "Little Joe, The Wrangler" (Destry Rides Again, 1939)
- "You've Got That Look" (Destry Rides Again, 1939)
- "See What the Boys in the Backroom Will Have" (Destry Rides Again, 1939)
- "I've Been In Love Before" (Seven Sinners, 1940)
- "The Man's in the Navy" (Seven Sinners, 1940)
- "Sweet Is the Blush of May" (The Flame of New Orleans, 1941)
- "He Lied and I Listened" (Manpower, 1941)
- "Strange Thing" (The Lady is Willing, 1942)
- "Tell Me, Tell Me, Evening Star" (Kismet, 1944)
- "Golden Earrings" (Golden Earrings, 1947)
- "Illusions" (A Foreign Affair, 1948)
- "Black Market" (A Foreign Affair, 1948)
- "The Ruins of Berlin" (A Foreign Affair, 1948)
- "La Vie en Rose" (Stage Fright, 1950)
- "The Laziest Gal in Town (Stage Fright, 1950)
- "Love is Lyrical" (Stage Fright, 1950)
- "Get Away, Young Man" (Rancho Notorious, 1952)
- "Gypsy Davey" (Rancho Notorious, 1952)
- "Les Jeux Sonts Faits" (The Monte Carlo Story, 1957)
- "Back Home Again in Indiana" (The Monte Carlo Story, 1957)
- "I May Never Go Home Anymore" (Witness for the Prosecution, 1958)
- "Just a Gigolo" (Just a Gigolo, 1978)

== Selected songs introduced by Marlene Dietrich ==
- 1930: "Falling In Love Again"
- 1930: "Naughty Lola"
- 1930: "Blonde Women"
- 1932: "Hot Voodoo"
- 1932: "You Little So and So"
- 1936: "Awake in a Dream"
- 1939: "See What the Boys in the Back Room Will Have"
- 1939: "You've Got That Look"
- 1948: "Illusions"
- 1948: "Black Market"
- 1953: "Look Me Over Closely"
- 1962: "Cherche la Rose"
- 1964: "In den Kasernen"
