= Falling in Love Again (Marlene Dietrich album) =

Compilation album by Marlene Dietrich
- Released: 1998
- Recorded: 1930s–1960s
- Genre: Traditional pop, cabaret
- Label: MCA

Marlene Dietrich chronology
Mythos und Legende / Myth and Legend (1994)	Falling in Love Again (1998)	Der Blonde Engel – Die Retrospektive (2001)

Falling in Love Again is a compilation album by German-American actress and singer Marlene Dietrich, released in 1998 by MCA Records (catalog no. MCAD-11849). The album was reissued in 2000 by Spectrum Music as Lili Marlene – The Best of Marlene Dietrich and later by MCA in the Universal Legends series.

The 16 tracks spanning more than two decades, from Dietrich's 1939 Decca sessions to later Dot and Kapp recordings.

Critics praised the compilation for providing a comprehensive overview of Dietrich's career, highlighting her distinctive interpretations, elegant orchestral arrangements, accented talk-sing style, and cabaret-influenced sound, while also noting occasional unevenness in some recordings.

== Album details ==
The album brings together 16 tracks recorded over a span of more than two decades, between her 1939 sessions for Decca Records and later material from Dot and Kapp Records, whose catalogs are now part of MCA-Universal. The compilation opens with selections from the Marlene Dietrich Souvenir Album, originally recorded in 1939 with the Victor Young Orchestra, including "Falling in Love Again" and Cole Porter's "You Do Something to Me". Other tracks from this period include "The Boys in the Backroom", featured in the film Destry Rides Again, and "You've Got That Look (That Makes Me Weak)".

The album also incorporates recordings made in 1957 for Dot Records under the musical direction of Burt Bacharach. Among them are "Near You", arranged with a semi-rock influence, as well as "Kisses Sweeter Than Wine" and "I May Never Go Home Anymore". In addition, the compilation features songs released in the 1960s through Kapp Records, including "If He Swing By the String" and "Such Trying Times", Dietrich's final single issued in 1965.

== Releases ==
In 2000, the album was re-released by Spectrum Music, a budget imprint of Universal Music Group, under the title Lili Marlene – The Best of Marlene Dietrich, featuring revised cover art (catalog no. 544 293-2). At the same year, MCA issued another edition as part of the Universal Legends series, again with updated artwork, further cementing the album's availability in the budget and legacy market.

== Critical reception ==
Professional ratings
Review scores
Source	Rating
AllMusic	4.5/5 stars
Calgary Herald	3/5
Los Angeles Times	3/4 stars

The AllMusic critic Cub Koda praised Falling in Love Again as a strong career overview, highlighting its elegant orchestral rendition of the title track, Marlene Dietrich's distinctive performances of film songs such as "The Boys in the Backroom" and "You've Got That Look (That Makes Me Weak)", and her interpretations of standards like "You Do Something to Me" and "You Go to My Head". He also noted the unusual inclusion of her rock & roll attempts in the 1950s and the campy flair of her final single in 1965, ultimately describing the compilation as "a great little career overview" that enriches the pop vocal catalog.

Cary Darling of the Calgary Herald noted that Falling in Love Again showcases much of Dietrich's recording career from 1940 to 1965. He observed that her distinctive accented, talk-sing style, though not technically strong, perfectly suited the cabaret-influenced Berlin sound, and that songs like "I've Been in Love Before" and "Lili Marlene" evoke a distinctly European atmosphere despite her long residence in the United States.

Los Angeles Times critic Robert Hilburn considered Falling in Love Again an "inviting glimpse" into the charisma and style that made Marlene Dietrich a star for nearly fifty years. While he praised tracks like the 1939 recordings of "Falling in Love Again" and Cole Porter's "You Do Something to Me", as well as the playful "I May Never Go Home Anymore", he found the compilation uneven, pointing to the awkward big-band version of "Kisses Sweeter Than Wine" as less successful. Overall, he regarded the album as a worthwhile retrospective despite its inconsistencies.

Karl Stark of Times Union noted that Falling in Love Again capitalizes on renewed interest in Marlene Dietrich, offering a 16-track set that spans much of her recording career. The critic wrote that, although Dietrich was not a technically strong vocalist, her accented, talk-sing style perfectly suited the jaded, Euro-cabaret atmosphere of Berlin between the wars. He also noted that, despite her long residence in the United States and strong anti-Nazi sympathies, recordings such as "I've Been in Love Before" and "Lili Marlene" evoke a poignant sense of wartime Europe.

== Track listing ==
Falling in Love Again
No.	Title	Writer(s)	Length
1.	"Falling in Love Again (Can't Help It)"	Friedrich Hollaender, Sammy Lerner	2:57
2.	"The Boys in the Backroom"	Friedrich Hollaender, Frank Loesser	2:02
3.	"You've Got That Look (That Leaves Me Weak)"	Friedrich Hollaender, Frank Loesser	2:43
4.	"I've Been in Love Before"	Friedrich Hollaender, Frank Loesser	2:37
5.	"You Do Something to Me"	Cole Porter	3:00
6.	"You Go to My Head"	J. Fred Coots, Haven Gillespie	3:10
7.	"Lili Marlene"	Hans Leip, Norbert Schultze, Mack David, Tommie Connor	3:26
8.	"Symphonie"	Alex Alstone, Roger Bernstein, Jack Lawrence, André Tabet	3:05
9.	"Black Market"	Friedrich Hollaender	3:11
10.	"Illusions"	Friedrich Hollaender	3:24
11.	"Another Spring, Another Love"	Gloria Shayne, Noel Paris	2:21
12.	"Near You"	Francis Craig, Kermit Goell	2:19
13.	"Kisses Sweeter than Wine"	Pete Seeger, Paul Campbell	3:03
14.	"I May Never Go Home Anymore"	Jack Brooks, Robert Schaefer	1:47
15.	"If He Swing by the String"	John Addison, Julian More	3:17
16.	"Such Trying Times"	John Addison, Julian More	2:55
Total length:			45:17

== Personnel ==
Credits adapted from the CD Falling in Love Again (MCA Records – MCAD-11849).

- Marlene Dietrich – vocals
- Victor Young and His Orchestra – accompaniment (tracks 1–6)
- Charles Magnante and His Orchestra – accompaniment (tracks 7–8)
- Gordon Jenkins and His Orchestra – accompaniment (tracks 9–10)
- Burt Bacharach – musical director, arranger and conductor (tracks 11–13)
- Orchestra conducted by Burt Bacharach – accompaniment (tracks 11–13)
- Orchestra – accompaniment (tracks 14–16)

=== Production ===
- Ron O’Brien – reissue producer
- Mike Ragogna – reissue producer
- Bill Lacey – digital remastering
- Doug Schwartz – digital remastering
- David McEowen – mastering
- Michael Ochs – cover photo
- William Claxton, George Hurrell, Ernst Haas, Peter Stackpole – photography
- Peggy Sirota, Ebet Roberts, Timepix, California Historical Society – photography
- Richard Weize, Tony Middleton, Arthur Kramer, Joe Russin, Hal B. Wallis – liner notes

== See also ==
- Marlene Dietrich discography
