= Marlene Dietrich (album) =

Compilation album by Marlene Dietrich
- Released: October 1957
- Genre: Traditional pop
- Label: Decca

Marlene Dietrich chronology
| At the Café de Paris (1954) | Marlene Dietrich (1957) | Dietrich in Rio (1960) |

Marlene Dietrich is a compilation album by German-American actress and singer Marlene Dietrich, released in October 1957 by Decca Records (catalog number DL 8465). The LP features Dietrich's interpretations of wartime standards and popular songs from her stage repertoire, including "Lili Marlene", "Falling in Love Again", and Cole Porter's "You Do Something to Me". The album showcases orchestral arrangements by Victor Young, Gordon Jenkins, and Charles Magnante.

Upon release, the album was noted for its sensuous and intimate vocal style, as well as its selection of wartime standards and Cole Porter compositions, though critics also remarked on vocal limitations and moderate commercial potential. Retrospective assessments later highlighted it as capturing Dietrich in fine form, particularly in her rendition of "Falling in Love Again".

The album has been reissued multiple times over the years, retaining the same tracklist, though the song order and titles may vary between editions. In 2022, Geffen Records released a digital deluxe edition of the album. This expanded version included supplemental tracks featuring Dietrich's recordings originally made for other labels, such as Dot Records.

== Background ==
Marlene Dietrich's association with Decca Records began in 1933 with the release of her first single for the label, "Assez" (catalog M 452). In 1940, Decca Records compiled Dietrich’s recordings into the box set Decca Presents Marlene Dietrich, initially released as three 10-inch 78 RPM shellac singles. The songs were recorded in Los Angeles under the direction of conductor Victor Young, with sessions taking place on two separate dates of December 1939. In 1948, Decca expanded this collection as Marlene Dietrich Souvenir Album, a 10-inch 78 RPM LP with two new tracks "Lili Marleen" and "Symphonie", recorded in New York with the orchestra conducted by Charles Magnante on September 7, 1945.

The album Marlene Dietrich compiles those recordings from Dietrich's work during World War II and her postwar cabaret performances in Las Vegas and London. Many tracks originated from her USO tours for Allied troops, where she became renowned for singing "Lili Marlene" in both German and English.

Decca expanded the compilation by adding two songs from Dietrich's film A Foreign Affair (1948)– "Black Market", which Billboard praised as demonstrating her "proficient" ability to "fill a tune about a black market with sex", and "Illusions", which the publication considered less impactful, released as a Shellac, 10", 78 RPM single (catalog no. 24582). These additions brought the album's total to ten tracks, all originally released in the 1940s.

== Release ==
The original album was released in 1957 in mono (catalog no. DL 78465) and stereo (catalog no. DL 78465). Over the years it was reissued with the same tracklisting, but vary order: Lili Marlene (MCA Coral – COPS 1259), Original Favorites (MCA Records – 202 941-241), Stars Of The Forties (MCA Coral – 5C 052-95752), Ritratto Di... (Record Bazaar – RB86), among others. In 1974, the Brazilian record label Chantecler, under license from MCA Records, reissued the LP (MCA Records – MCALP-600.068). This release was driven by several factors, including the screening of the film The Blue Angel (1930) (which had already been in theaters for nearly four weeks) and the artist's tour in Brazil, which was scheduled for that September. This Brazilian edition was distinguished by its cover, which featured a significant alteration from the original: the artwork focused on a close-up of the artist's face, taken from the original photo, and replaced the pink background with a new green background color.

In June 1982, Billboard reported that Dietrich was included in MCA Records' "Collectibles LP Line", a series of twenty reissued albums drawn from the company's vaults. The mentioned album was a reissued under the new title Her Complete Decca Recordings (catalog number MCA 1501). This re-release was made available in both LP and cassette tape formats. This new edition also featured modified cover art and an altered track sequence from the original 1957 version. Dave Dexter Jr. of Billboard noted that while the series lacked detailed liner notes, the omission was unlikely to be missed by the public, as the graphics were visually appealing and each LP included at least ten tracks.

In 2022, Geffen Records released a digital deluxe edition of the album with eight bonus tracks and the same cover art. "Kisses Sweeter than Wine" and its B-side "I May Never Go Home" was one of the tracks included on the album. Released after the album's original launch in 1958, the song received a rating of 73 (out of 100) from Billboard magazine. Of the other songs included on the album was the 1957 single, "Another Spring, Another Love" / "Near You" (Dot. catalog no. 15645). Cash Box magazine awarded the single a "B+" for the A-side and a "B" for the B-side. The review praised "Another Spring, Another Love", the theme from the film Witness for the Prosecution (1957), describing it as a "haunting mood number" and predicting it would get "heavy play" on the radio upon the film's release, calling it a "fine first showing" for Dietrich on the Dot label. Regarding the B-side, "Near You", the publication highlighted the innovative approach, noting that the artist "chants the standard against a rock and roll background", resulting in an "interesting coupling that deserves attention". Billboard also praised "This World of Ours" as a "well-timed inspirational ballad" and highlighted Marlene Dietrich's "exceptional performances," predicting that the combination would "garner much radio play and sales"..

The 1982's compilation The Legendary, Lovely Marlene, has the same songs of the deluxe edition, but with different art and track order.

== Critical reception ==
Professional ratings
Review scores
| Source | Rating |
|---|---|
| AllMusic | 4.5/5 stars |
| Billboard | 78/100 |
| The Encyclopedia of Popular Music | 4/5 stars |

Billboard noted that Marlene Dietrich "still registers in the grooves" with her trademark glamour, while Cash Box wrote that the compilation features "some of the most celebrated" recordings by the singer, delivered in her "sensuous and intimate vocal brand". The album was featured in Nancy Jarrett's "Platter Patter" column in Lakeland Ledger, and in Norman Weiser's "Music for Family Listening" list in Family Weekly, where he commented: "While the glamorous granny's voice leaves much to be desired, Mom and Pop should like the item".

St. Petersburg Times highlighted Marlene Dietrich's self-titled album as "one of her best", particularly praising its striking color portrait of the artist. Melody Maker hailed the album as a relic that invokes "magic memories", classifying it as an "invaluable" set of the "great Marlene" at her best. Tárik de Souza of Jornal do Brasil noted that Dietrich was valued more for her legend than for her voice, which he described as "harsh" and "inflexible", and concluded that the album was mainly aimed at fans and collectors.

In a contemporary review of the compilation Her Complete Decca Recordings, Cub Koda of AllMusic noted that while Marlene Dietrich recorded many of her signature songs multiple times for different labels, this particular compilation "catches her in fine form". He specifically highlighted the album's "excellent" reading of her biggest hit "Falling in Love Again".

== Track listing ==
Side A
| No. | Title | Writer(s) | Length |
|---|---|---|---|
| 1. | "Lili Marlene" | Leip, Dietrich, Schultze | 3:22 |
| 2. | "Symphonie" | Alstone, Tabet, Bernstein | 3:00 |
| 3. | "I've Been in Love Before" | Loesser, Hollander | 3:00 |
| 4. | "You Do Something to Me" | Porter | 2:58 |
| 5. | "Illusions" | Hollander | 3:20 |

Side B
| No. | Title | Writer(s) | Length |
|---|---|---|---|
| 1. | "You've Got That Look (That Makes me Weak)" | Loesser, Hollander | 2:40 |
| 2. | "You Go to My Head" | Gillespie, Coots | 3:08 |
| 3. | "Black Market" | Hollander | 3:08 |
| 4. | "Falling in Love Again" | Hollander | 2:54 |
| 5. | "The Boys in the Backroom" | Loesser, Hollander | 1:59 |

Digital Deluxe Edition bonus tracks
| No. | Title | Writer(s) | Length |
|---|---|---|---|
| 11. | "Another Spring, Another Love" | Gloria Shayne, Noel Paris | 2:22 |
| 12. | "Near You" | Kermit Goell, Francis Craig | 2:20 |
| 13. | "I May Never Go Home Anymore" | Ralph Arthur Robertd, Jack Brooks | 1:45 |
| 14. | "Kisses Sweeter than Wine" | Joel Newman, Paul Campbell | 3:05 |
| 15. | "If he Swing by the String" | John Addison, Julia More | 3:15 |
| 16. | "Such Trying Times" | J. Addison, J. More | 2:57 |
| 17. | "This World of Ours" | Jean-Jacques Debout, Raymond Le Senechal, Jack Harrison | 2:26 |
| 18. | "Candles Glowing" | Lotar Olias, Ernst Bader | 2:34 |

== Personnel ==
Credits adapted from the liner notes of Marlene Dietrich LP (catalog no. DL 78465).

- Marlene Dietrich – vocals
- Victor Young – orchestra director
- Gordon Jenkins – orchestra director
- Charles Magnante – orchestra director

== See also ==
- Marlene Dietrich discography
