= Dietrich in Rio =

Live album by Marlene Dietrich
- Released: March 1960
- Genre: Traditional pop
- Length: 37:50
- Label: Columbia Records
- Producer: Burt Bacharach

Marlene Dietrich chronology
| Marlene Dietrich (1957) | Dietrich in Rio (1960) | Wiedersehen mit Marlene (1960) |

Dietrich in Rio is a live album by German singer and actress Marlene Dietrich, released by Columbia Records in March 1960. It is Dietrich's second "live" release, following At the Café de Paris (1954).

Set against the backdrop of the singer's concert series in Brazil between July and August 1959, the album features songs in four different languages: English, French, German, and Portuguese. Its sound ranges from ballads to traditional pop music, including a song used to accompany a can-can dance performance.

Although Billboard reported that the singer's record label had recorded one of her shows at the Copacabana Palace in Rio de Janeiro, the recordings used on the album were actually made in a studio, with applause added during post-production. The album was released on LP with catalog number WS 316, and was later reissued on compact disc (CD) by Sony Music Special Products.

== Background ==
From the early 1950s until the mid-1970s, Marlene Dietrich worked almost exclusively as a cabaret artist, performing live in major theaters in large cities around the world. On July 24, 1959, Dietrich disembarked from a Varig flight in Rio de Janeiro for a short season, which would also include shows in São Paulo, accompanied by pianist Burt Bacharach, with whom she performed in highly successful recitals. Many artists and renowned figures awaited the artist at Rio de Janeiro/Galeão International Airport, among them Marshal Teixeira Lott, then Minister of War of the Juscelino Kubitschek government. After disembarking, the German actress attended a cocktail party and gave an interview. She stated that her show was conceived and organized by herself.

The tour dates included the Copacabana Palace hotel (from July 27 to August 2, 1959) and the Teatro Record (São Paulo) (from August 4 to 9). Dietrich not only negotiated a considerable fee but also demanded a share of the ticket sales. On her opening night at the Copacabana Palace, 700 tickets were sold, despite the venue's maximum capacity being 400 people.

The artist hired theater producer Abelardo Figueiredo to provide the show's backing singers and made one demand: no dancer could lift their leg higher than her. In the show, Dietrich sang and danced, including a can-can number, and was moved to tears as she drove the audience wild singing the old song "Lili Marlene". During the tour she interpreted some old hits from her career, but for the Brazilian shows, she included a song in Portuguese: "Luar do Sertão", a song by Catulo da Paixão Cearense. She learned the lyrics of the song when she met Brazilian singer Cauby Peixoto in Hollywood, months before the performance.

== Recording ==
In its August 3, 1959 issue, Billboard reported that Columbia Records had recorded Marlene Dietrich's show at the Copacabana Palace nightclub in Rio de Janeiro in July 1959. However, although marketed as a "live" album, it consists of recordings made in a New York studio, with real applause recorded during the tour to create a "live" atmosphere. Four tracks from Dietrich in Rio can be heard without the "live" atmosphere on the CD The Marlene Dietrich Album, released in 1991.

== Release ==
In its February 29, 1960 issue, Billboard published an advertisement from Columbia Records announcing the upcoming release of Dietrich in Rio, scheduled for the following month. Later, the album was included on Cash Box's list of new releases for March 1960. Following this, it received an international rollout in deluxe editions. In France, the label Philips Réalités issued a limited run of 5,000 copies (catalog no. V 31), which Cash Box described as featuring "another successful deluxe repertoire". Similarly, CBS Columbia released the album in Mexico before she left town to perform in the United States.

In 1974, Columbia included the album in the box set entitled Marléne (catalog number CBS 66317). Interestingly, in Israel, the cover used for one of these editions was reused for the album At the Café de Paris, while the back cover and tracklist remained unchanged (catalog no. CBS – 62316). In 1989, CBS Special Products released the album on CD (catalog number A 316) as part of its "Collectors' Series".

Since the 1990s, various record labels have released CD compilations containing the complete repertoire of the original album, including Sei lieb zu mir (1993, Remember — RMB 75056), Lili Marlene (2001, Music Digital — 13 527), Days Gone By... (2004, Madacy – MEG2 50772), and others. Subsequently, these works were also released in digital format by various labels through streaming platforms, featuring different cover variations. In Europe, the repertoire entered the public domain, which facilitated the proliferation of these editions; Many of the CDs released are also unauthorized, having appeared on the market through piracy or by taking advantage of the public domain status.

== Critical reception ==
Professional ratings
Review scores
| Source | Rating |
|---|---|
| AllMusic | 2/5 stars |
| Record Mirror | 3/5 stars |
| The Encyclopedia of Popular Music | 4/5 stars |

The Billboard review stated that Dietrich "has never sounded better than in this set" and praised her program of international standards and highlighted songs like "Boys in the Backroom", "I've Grown Accustomed to Her Face", and "Well I'll Right". The magazine also complimented the album's packaging, noting its "stunning cover photos" as "highly displayable".

Cash Box highlighted the album's origin from her "record-shattering" engagement in Rio de Janeiro. The reviewer noted that the live recording successfully "preserves the excitement" of the performance, including Dietrich's between-song chatter and the enthusiastic audience reaction. The critic concluded by affirming that "She's still a grand performer".

The critic of High Fidelity said the album shows Dietrich still able to drive audiences "to a state bordering on frenzy", even as she refuses "to stick to her knitting". "Falling in Love Again" was described as something she is now "milking for all it’s worth". sounding almost like a burlesque of her earlier version. By contrast, the reviewer praised her "unexpectedly good" take on "Well All Right" and a "teary" reading of "One for My Baby". The piece concluded that, while she is a "knowing performer", that "whiskeyish soprano" can't replace her glamorous personality. The mono sound was considered "acceptable", with the stereo version offering "scarcely any improvement".

John S. Wilson from The New York Times praised the album for its vibrant and energetic live performance quality. The critic noted that the album successfully captures her unique and special flavor in action, presenting her at her most dynamic and engaging.

Record World highlighted the album's packaging, noting the "glamorous grandmother" pin-up picture on the front cover. The review also mentioned that the album contained a set of some of her best-known songs, including "Look Me Over Closely", "My Blue Heaven", and "One For My Baby".

In a contemporary retrospective review an AllMusic critic pointed out that the album "finds Dietrich in a sly, almost silly mood, singing with lusty humor and coy flirtatiousness" and that "Dietrich's voice is huskier than it was in her heyday, but this suits the material, which has been rearranged to fit her new lower register, very well".

== Commercial performance ==
Dietrich's hit 1960 European tour, especially the sold-out Dutch shows, fueled renewed demand for her work. Cash Box noted "big interest" in the Philips LP (Dietrich in Rio) as a direct result.

== Track listing ==
| No. | Title | Writer(s) | Length |
|---|---|---|---|
| 1. | "Look Me Over Closely" | Frederick Hollander | 2:44 |
| 2. | "You're the Cream in My Coffee" | Lew Brown / Buddy DeSylva / Ray Henderson | 2:31 |
| 3. | "My Blue Heaven" | Walter Donaldson / George A. Whiting | 2:50 |
| 4. | "The Boys in the Backroom" | Hollander / Frank Loesser | 2:20 |
| 5. | "Das Lied ist aus" | Robert Stolz / Walter Reisch | 4:01 |
| 6. | "Je tire ma révérence" | Pascal Bastia | 3:29 |
| 7. | "All Right, Okay, You Win!" | Mayme Watts / Sidney Wyche | 2:31 |
| 8. | "Makin' Whoopee" | Walter Donaldson / Gus Kahn | 4:04 |
| 9. | "I've Grown Accustomed to Her Face" | Alan Jay Lerner / Frederick Loewe | 4:30 |
| 10. | "One for My Baby" | Harold Arlen / Johnny Mercer | 4:16 |
| 11. | "Maybe I'll Come Back" | Charles L. Cooke / Howard C. Jeffrey | 2:27 |
| 12. | "Luar do Sertão" | Catulo da Paixão Cearense / João Pernambuco | 2:07 |

== See also ==
- Marlene Dietrich discography
