= On Screen, Stage and Radio =

Compilation album by Marlene Dietrich
- Released: 1992
- Recorded: 1930–1957
- Genre: Traditional pop, cabaret
- Label: Legend

Marlene Dietrich chronology
The Essential Marlene Dietrich (1991)	On Screen, Stage and Radio (1992)	The Cosmopolitan Marlene Dietrich (1993)

On Screen, Stage and Radio is a two-disc compilation album by German-American singer and actress Marlene Dietrich, released in 1992 by Legend label (catalog no. CD 6006–6007), and eaturing 56 tracks from film soundtracks, stage performances, and radio broadcasts, many released commercially for the first time. The album includes performances with Bing Crosby and recordings sourced from original films, providing a retrospective of her career.

The compilation includes a 20-page booklet with photographs and a filmography. It contains both iconic film songs and cabaret and radio performances, highlighting Dietrich’s work across multiple media.

== Album details ==
The collection brings together film soundtrack recordings, stage performances and radio excerpts, compiling rare material — many of the tracks had seen little previous commercial release and some appeared on compact disc (CD) for the first time in this edition. The set contains 56 tracks across two CDs (32 on disc one and 24 on disc two) and was conceived as a retrospective of Dietrich's work on screen, on stage, and in radio broadcasts.

The album features fragments from radio programs such as Tallulah Bankhead’s The Big Show (1951) and The Bing Crosby Show for General Electric (1952), which include comic exchanges and a duet with Bing Crosby on "La Vie en rose". Dietrich’s final studio performance came years later in 1978, when she recorded the title track “Just a Gigolo” for David Hemmings' film of the same name.

The compilation was reissued in 2001. It includes a 20-page booklet featuring 18 photographs from the Jacque Hubert collection, with text by Alan Eichler and a filmography. Notably, track three on disc one presents a combination of four versions of "Ich bin von Kopf bis Fuß auf Liebe eingestellt", all in low audio quality. In fact, all tracks on disc one are sourced directly from the original films. At the beginning of "The Boys in the Backroom", the recording includes a portion of the original dialogue from the film Destry Rides Again (1939), featuring the voices of James Stewart and Marlene Dietrich.

== Critical reception ==
Professional ratings
Review scores
Source	Rating
The Encyclopedia of Popular Music	3/5 stars

The AllMusic review described the compilation as "excellent", noting that it provides a comprehensive overview of Marlene Dietrich's multifaceted talent. The critic highlighted that the album serves as an effective introduction to the artist, showcasing both her iconic film songs and her cabaret and radio performances, which reveal a more spirited and playful side of Dietrich. The material was described as "utterly delightful" and "essential", emphasizing the compilation's ability to capture the essence of the artist and her historical significance. Overall, the review presents the album as one of the most complete and recommended ways to engage with Marlene Dietrich’s work.

== Track listing ==
On Screen, Stage and Radio: The Movie Years — disc one
No.	Title	Writer(s)	Movie	Length
1.	"Lola" (German & English)	Friedrich Hollaender	from The Blue Angel (1930)	1:30
2.	"Kinder, heut' abend, da such' ich mir was aus" ("This Evening Children") (German & English)	F. Hollaender, Robert Liebmann	from The Blue Angel (1930)	6:21
3.	"Ich bin von Kopf bis Fuß auf Liebe eingestellt"	F. Hollaender	from The Blue Angel (1930)	4:43
4.	"Falling in Love Again"	F. Hollaender, Sammy Lerner	from The Blue Angel (1930)	4:28
5.	"Nimm Dich in Acht vor blonden Frauen" ("Beware of Blond Women") (German & English)	F. Hollaender, Richard Rillo	from The Blue Angel (1930)	2:37
6.	"Quand L'Amour Meurt"	O. Crémieux, G. Millandy	from Morocco (1930)	1:23
7.	"What Am I Bid?" (aka "What Am I Bid for My Apple")	Karl Hajos, Leo Robin	from Morocco (1930)	1:24
8.	"German Lullaby"	F. Hollaender	from Blonde Venus (1932)	1:53
9.	"Hot Voodoo"	Ralph Rainger, Sam Coslow	from Blonde Venus (1932)	1:59
10.	"You Little So-and-So"	Robin, Coslow	from Blonde Venus (1932)	1:34
11.	"I Couldn't Be Annoyed"	Leo Robin, Whiting	from Blonde Venus (1932)	2:50
12.	"You Are My Song of Songs"	K. Hajos	from The Song of Songs (1933)	1:07
13.	"Jonny"	F. Hollaender	from The Song of Songs (1933)	1:44
14.	"Three Sweethearts Have I"	R. Rainger, L. Robin	from The Devil Is a Woman (1935)	3:22
15.	"Awake in a Dream"	F. Hollaender	from Desire (1936)	2:16
16.	"Little Joe the Wrangler"	N. Howard Thorp	from Destry Rides Again (1939)	1:18
17.	"You've Got That Look"	F. Hollaender, Frank Loesser	from Destry Rides Again (1939)	2:04
18.	"The Boys in the Back Room"	F. Hollaender, F. Loesser	from Destry Rides Again (1939)	1:58
19.	"I Can't Give You Anything but Love"	Jimmy McHugh, Dorothy Fields	from Seven Sinners (1940)	1:30
20.	"I've Been in Love Before"	F. Hollaender, F. Losser	from Seven Sinners (1940)	1:26
21.	"The Man's in the Navy"	F. Hollaender, F. Losser	from Seven Sinners (1940)	1:47
22.	"Sweet as the Blush of May"	F. Hollaender	from The Flame of New Orleans (1941)	2:53
23.	"Tell Me, Tell Me, Evening Star" (dialogue with Ronald Colman)	F. Hollaender	from Kismet (1944)	1:12
24.	"Gypsy Song"	Jay Livingston, Ray Evans, Victor Young	from Golden Earrings (1947)	1:31
25.	"Black Market"	F. Hollaender	from A Foreign Affair (1948)	4:05
26.	"Illusions"	F. Hollaender	from A Foreign Affair (1948)	2:14
27.	"The Ruins of Berlin"	F. Hollaender	from A Foreign Affair (1948)	1:57
28.	"The Laziest Gal in Town"	Cole Porter	from Stage Fright (1950)	3:18
29.	"Gypsy Davey"	Traditional	from Rancho Notorious (1952)	0:47
30.	"Get Away, Young Man"	K. Darby	from Rancho Notorious (1952)	2:19
31.	"Back Home in Indiana"	Ballard MacDonald, James F. Hanley	from The Monte Carlo Story (1957)	1:00
32.	"I May Never Go Home Anymore" (dialogue with Charles Laughton and Tyrone Power)	F. Hollaender	from Witness for the Prosecution (1958)	1:35

On Screen, Stage and Radio: The Concert Years — disc two
No.	Title	Writer(s)	Length
1.	"Look Me Over Closely"	Terry Gilkyson	3:00
2.	"Time for Love"	F. Hollander	2:37
3.	"Come Rain or Come Shine"	Harold Arlen, Johnny Mercer	2:55
4.	"Love Me" (Studio version)	F. Hollander	2:58
5.	"Peter"	F. Hollander	3:50
6.	"Ich hab' noch einen Koffer in Berlin"	Ralph Maria Siegel; Aldo von Pinelli	3:10
7.	"Symphonie"	Michael Jary; Günther Schwenn	2:14
8.	"Ein Roman"		1:32
9.	"Let's Call it a Day"	H. Arlen; Ted Koehler	2:23
10.	"No Love, No Nothin'"	Harry Warren; L. Robin	2:46
11.	"I Dreamed Last Night"	F. Hollander	1:54
12.	"Lieb' zu mir" (Mean to Me)	Fred E. Ahlert, Roy Turk	2:01
13.	"Das alte Lied"	Theo Mackeben	2:11
14.	"Ich weiss nicht zu wem ich gehöre"	F. Hollander	1:14
15.	"Je sais que vous êtes jolie"		1:40
16.	"Frag nicht warum ich gehe"		1:21
17.	"Love Me" (Live version)	F. Hollander	1:33
18.	"I've Been in Love Before"	F. Hollander	2:22
19.	"La Vie en rose" (with Joe Venuti and Bing Crosby)	Louiguy, Édith Piaf, Mack David	4:20
20.	"Conversation with Bing Crosby"	—	3:22
21.	"Conversation with Tallulah Bankhead"	—	3:14
22.	"Falling in Love Again"	F. Hollaender	1:41
23.	"A Return Visit with Tallulah"	—	4:20
24.	"The Boys in the Back Room"	F. Hollaender, F. Loesser	3:00

== Personnel ==
Credits adapted from the CD On Screen, Stage and Radio (Legend, catalog no. CD 6006-6007)

- Liner notes by Alan Eichler
- Photos courtesy of the Jacques Hubert Collection

== See also ==
- Marlene Dietrich discography
