= Der Blonde Engel – Die Retrospektive =

Compilation album by Marlene Dietrich
- Released: 12 July 2001
- Recorded: February 6, 1928–1978
- Genre: Traditional pop
- Label: EMI

Marlene Dietrich chronology
Falling in Love Again (1998)	Der Blonde Engel – Die Retrospektive (2001)	Love Songs (2004)

Der Blonde Engel – Die Retrospektive is a box set compilation album by German-American actress and singer Marlene Dietrich, released in 2001 by EMI to commemorate the 100th anniversary of her birth on December 27, 1901. Spanning four discs, it covers recordings made between 1928 and 1978, including studio tracks, singles, rarities, and live performances in multiple languages. The set was issued with remastered sound and a booklet containing photographs and historical notes.

The release received positive critical reception, with reviewers praising its completeness and archival value. A condensed single-disc edition, Der Blonde Engel – 25 Lieder, was also issued in 2001 and entered the German albums chart in January 2002, peaking at number 98 for one week.

== Album details ==
The collection spans four compact discs (CDs) and features a comprehensive retrospective of her musical career from 1928 to 1978, including remastered recordings in German, English, French, and Hebrew. It highlights Dietrich's style blending cabaret, jazz, and wartime ballads, with themes of love, nostalgia, and anti-war sentiment. The box set includes a booklet with photographs, credits, and historical context.

The album's content is divided thematically across the discs, starting with classic album tracks from the 1950s and 1960s on the first two CDs, focusing on German-language songs like "Sag' Mir, Wo Die Blumen Sind" (a German version of "Where Have All the Flowers Gone?") and multilingual covers such as "La Vie en rose" and "Blowin' in the Wind". The third CD compiles singles from 1928 to 1949, including hits from her film career like "Lili Marlene" and "The Boys in the Back Room" while the fourth features rarities and live performances, some released for the first time.

A companion single-CD edition, Der Blonde Engel – 25 Lieder, was also released in 2001, offering a condensed selection of 25 tracks from the larger set for broader accessibility. While less comprehensive, it shares the same remastering quality and focuses on Dietrich's most famous songs.

== Critical reception ==
Professional ratings
Review scores
Source	Rating
The Encyclopedia of Popular Music	4/5 stars

Writing for the magazine Neue Musikzeitung in July 2002, critic Helmut Hein reflected on Dietrich's distinctive vocal style and her status as a performer. Hein emphasized that Dietrich’s artistry lay beyond conventional measures of vocal technique, recalling Ella Fitzgerald's description of her "great non-voice". He highlighted the singer's ability to transform songs across genres into part of her own repertoire, attributing some of this achievement to her collaboration with musical director Burt Bacharach. Hein described Dietrich's career as that of a cosmopolitan entertainer whose performances embodied both desire and irony, noting that the EMI box set presented a wide-ranging retrospective of her work, encompassing both familiar standards and rare material.

The album was highlighted by critic Viktor Rotthaler in the German publication Neue Musikzeitung (nmz). In his December 2001 article entitled "Ich weiß nicht, zu wem ich gehöre" ("I Don't Know to Whom I Belong"), Rotthaler featured the box set as a key recommendation for comprehending Marlene Dietrich's enduring cultural and musical legacy.

== Commercial performance ==
In Germany, the single-disc edition of the release entered the albums chart on 14 January 2002, reaching number 98. It remained on the chart for one week.

== Track listing ==
CD 1: Classic Album Tracks 1951 - 1964
No.	Title	Writer(s)	Length
1.	"Sag' mir, wo die Blumen sind"	P. Seeger / M. Colpet	3:36
2.	"Für alles kommt die Zeit (Turn, Turn, Turn)"	P. Seeger / M. Colpet	2:44
3.	"Die Antwort weiß ganz allein der Wind"	B. Dylan / H. Bradtke	3:58
4.	"Ich bin von Kopf bis Fuß auf Liebe eingestellt"	F. Hollaender	2:37
5.	"Johnny, wenn du Geburtstag hast"	F. Hollaender	2:55
6.	"Wenn ich mir was wünschen dürfte"	F. Hollaender	3:23
7.	"Ich weiss nicht, zu wem ich gehöre"	F. Hollaender / R. Liebmann	2:38
8.	"Mein blondes Baby"	P. Kreuder / F. Rotter	3:53
9.	"Allein in einer großen Stadt"	F. Wachsmann / M. Colpet	4:58
10.	"Und wenn er wiederkommt"	Gerard / M. Colpet, M. Maeterlinck	3:01
11.	"In den Kasernen"	Gerard / Koch	3:13
12.	"Wenn die Soldaten"	Traditional	3:01
13.	"Marie, Marie (deutsche Version)"	G. Becaud / M. Colpet	4:41
14.	"Ich werde dich lieben (Theme For Young Lovers)"	Welch / M. Dietrich	2:46
15.	"Sch... kleines Baby (Hush, Little Baby)"	Siegel, Coster / M. Dietrich	2:31
16.	"Mutter, hast du mir vergeben"	Niemen / Grau, dt. M. Dietrich	4:11
17.	"Auf der Mundharmonika"	M. Spoliansky / R. Gilbert	2:39
18.	"Wenn der Sommer wieder einzieht"	Cavanaugh, Weldon / Robertson, dt. L. Metzl	3:03
19.	"Schlittenfahrt (The Surrey With The Fringe On Top)"	R. Rodgers / O. Hammerstein II., dt. L. Metzl	3:34
20.	"Mein Mann ist verhindert (Miss Otis Regrets)"	C. Porter / dt. L. Metzl	3:45
21.	"Ach, Fräulein Annie wohnt schon lang nicht hier (Annie Doesn’t Live Here Anymore)"	J. Young, J. Burke / A. Spina, dt. L. Metzl	2:56
22.	"Sag' mir Adieu (Time On My Hands)"	V. Youmans / H. Adamson, Gordon, dt. L. Metzl	3:10
23.	"Das Lied ist aus (Frag' nicht warum ich gehe)"	R. Stolz / W. Reisch, A. Robinson	3:46

CD 2: Classic Album Tracks 1952 - 1965
No.	Title	Writer(s)	Length
1.	"La Vie en Rose"	Louiguy / Édith Piaf	2:50
2.	"Cherche la Rose"	H. Salvador / R. Rouzaud	4:00
3.	"Où Vont les Fleurs"	P. Seeger / F. Lemarque / R. Rouzaud	3:34
4.	"Déjeuner du Matin"	J. Kosma / J. Prévert	2:46
5.	"I Wish You Love (Live)"	C. Trenet / L. Beach	3:23
6.	"Shir Hatan (Jackel Song) (Live)"	M. Shachar / Y. Zarai	3:00
7.	"Go 'Way From My Window (Live)"	J.J. Niles	2:57
8.	"Lazy Afternoon (Live)"	J. Moross / J. Latouche	2:29
9.	"Makin' Whoopee"	W. Donaldson / G. Kahn	3:44
10.	"I've Grown Accustomed to Her Face"	F. Loewe / A.J. Lerner	3:53
11.	"One for My Baby (And One More for the Road)"	H. Arlen / J. Mercer	4:07
12.	"Where Have All the Flowers Gone"	P. Seeger	3:34
13.	"Blowin' in the Wind"	B. Dylan	4:00
14.	"Paff, der Zauberdrache"	P. Yarrow / L. Lipton / dt. F. Oldörp	4:08
15.	"Kleine treue Nachtigall (Message to Michael)"	B. Bacharach / H. David, M. Colpet	2:45
16.	"Bitte geh' nicht fort (Ne me quitte pas)"	J. Brel / M. Colpet	3:32
17.	"Die Welt war jung (Le Chevalier de Paris)"	M. Philippe-Gérard / M. Colpet	3:20
18.	"Ich hab noch einen Koffer in Berlin"	R. M. Siegel / A. v. Pinelli	3:03
19.	"Lieber Leierkastenmann"	W. Kollo	3:40
20.	"Das war in Schöneberg"	W. Kollo / R. Bernauer, R. Schanzer	2:35
21.	"Es gibt im Leben manchmal Momente"	W. Bromme / Steinberg	1:47
22.	"Nach meine Beene ist ja ganz Berlin verrückt"	W. Kollo / F.W. Hardt	3:35
23.	"Wer wird denn weinen, wenn man auseinandergeht"	H. Hirsch / A. Rebner	1:02
24.	"Das ist Berlin wie's weint, das ist Berlin wie's lacht"	W. Kollo	2:39
25.	"Solang noch untern Linden (Berlin bleibt doch Berlin)"	W. Kollo / Haller, Wolff, Rideamus	1:34

CD 3: Singles 1928 - 1949
No.	Title	Writer(s)	Length
1.	"Illusions"	F. Hollaender	3:19
2.	"Black Market"	F. Hollaender	3:08
3.	"Lili Marlene"	N. Schultze / H. Leip / M. Dietrich	3:22
4.	"You Go to My Head"	Coots / Gillespie	3:04
5.	"You Do Something to Me"	C. Porter	2:56
6.	"You've Got That Look"	F. Hollaender / F. Loesser	2:39
7.	"The Boys in the Backroom"	F. Hollaender / F. Loesser	2:00
8.	"I've Been in Love Before"	F. Hollaender / F. Loesser	2:33
9.	"Moi, je m'ennuie"	Wal-Berg / C. Francois	3:11
10.	"Assez"	Wal-Berg, E. Stern / J. Tranchant	3:26
11.	"Allein in einer großen Stadt"	F. Wachsmann / M. Colpet	3:44
12.	"Ja, so bin ich"	R. Stolz / W. Reisch	3:01
13.	"Wo ist der Mann?"	P. Kreuder / M. Colpet	3:10
14.	"Mein blondes Baby"	P. Kreuder / F. Rotter	3:08
15.	"Quand l'amour meurt"	O. Crémieux / G. Millandy	3:08
16.	"Leben ohne Liebe kannst du nicht"	M. Spoliansky / R. Gilbert	3:01
17.	"Wenn ich mir was wünschen dürfte (rare, alternative Version)"	F. Hollaender	1:55
18.	"Peter"	R. Nelson / F. Hollaender	3:18
19.	"Jonny"	F. Hollaender	2:56
20.	"Ich bin von Kopf bis Fuß auf Liebe eingestellt"	F. Hollaender	3:21
21.	"Nimm dich in Acht vor blonden Frau'n"	F. Hollaender / R. Rillo	3:10
22.	"Kinder, heut' Abend da such ich mir was aus"	F. Hollaender / R. Liebmann	2:39
23.	"Ich bin die fesche Lola"	F. Hollaender / R. Liebmann	2:34
24.	"Wenn die beste Freundin"	M. Spoliansky / M. Schiffer	3:08
25.	"Give Me the Man"	K. Hajos / L. Robin	3:06
26.	"Falling in Love Again"	F. Hollaender / F. Connelly	3:09

CD 4: Rare Recordings 1929 - 1978
No.	Title	Writer(s)	Length
1.	"UFA-Auditions 1929, Berlin"	B. G. De Sylva / N. Brown, R. Henderson; H. Hirsch / A. Rebner	2:55
2.	"Hot Voodoo"	R. Rainger / S. Coslow	3:26
3.	"Jonny"	F. Hollaender / E. Heyman	1:46
4.	"Ton Regard"	R. Dumas / E. Recagno	3:09
5.	"If It Isn't Pain, Then It Isn't Love"	R. Rainger / L. Robin	2:22
6.	"Awake in a Dream"	F. Hollaender / L. Robin	2:15
7.	"He Lied and I Listened"	F. Hollaender / F. Loesser	1:24
8.	"Du hast 'nen Blick (You've Got That Look)"	F. Hollaender / F. Loesser / dt. L. Metzl	1:46
9.	"Gib doch den Männern am Stammtisch ihr Gift (The Boys In The Backroom)"	F. Hollaender / F. Loesser / dt. L. Metzl	1:41
10.	"Little Joe, the Wrangler"	F. Hollaender / F. Loesser	1:18
11.	"The Man's in the Navy"	F. Hollaender / F. Loesser	1:46
12.	"Ich heirate nie (South American Way)"	J. McHugh / A. Dubin / dt. L. Metzl	1:52
13.	"Ich weiss nicht, zu wem ich gehöre"	F. Hollaender / R. Liebmann	2:29
14.	"Black Market"	F. Hollaender	4:04
15.	"Ruins of Berlin (In den Ruinen von Berlin)"	F. Hollaender	2:06
16.	"The Laziest Gal in Town"	C. Porter	3:18
17.	"Love Is Lyrical (Whisper Sweet Little Nothing To Me)"	M. Spoliansky	1:13
18.	"Get Away, Young Man"	K. Darby	2:15
19.	"Qui me délivra"	N. Louvier	2:48
20.	"I Refuse to Rock and Roll (Live)"	N. Brodszky / S. Cahn	5:43
21.	"My Baby Just Cares for Me (Live)"	W. Donaldson / G. Kahn	3:10
22.	"Kisses Sweeter Than Wine (rare Studio Version)"	Newman / Campbell	2:59
23.	"Look Me Over Closely"	T. Gilkyson / M. Miller	3:03
24.	"Alle Tage ist kein Sonntag"	C. Clewing / C. Ferdinands	2:44
25.	"Ich hab noch einen Koffer in Berlin"	R.M. Siegel / A. Pinelli	3:13
26.	"Just a Gigolo (Marlenes letzte Schallplatten-Aufnahme)"	L. Casucci / J. Brammer / I. Caesar	3:30

Der Blonde Engel – 25 Lieder [Condensed Edition]
No.	Title	Writer(s)	Length
1.	"Nimm Dich In Acht Vor Blonden Frau'n"	Hollaender	3:13
2.	"Ich Bin Die Fesche Lola"	Hollaender, Liebmann	1:34
3.	"Ich Bin Von Kopf Bis Fuß Auf Liebe Eingestellt"	Hollaender	2:36
4.	"Ich Weiß Nicht, Zu Wem Ich Gehöre"	Hollaender, Liebmann	2:28
5.	"Die Welt War Jung (Le Chevalier De Paris)"	Colpet, Philippe-Gerard	3:21
6.	"Allein In Einer Großen Stadt"	Wachsmann, Colpet	4:58
7.	"Johnny, Wenn Du Geburtstag Hast"	Hollaender	2:55
8.	"Kinder, Heut' Abend Da Such Ich Mir Was Aus"	Hollaender	2:02
9.	"Wer Wird Denn Weinen, Wenn Man Auseinander Geht"	Rebner, Hirsch	1:03
10.	"Peter"	Hollaender, Nelson	3:25
11.	"Mein Blondes Baby"	Rotter, Kreuder	3:53
12.	"Paff, Der Zauberdrachen"	Oldörp, Lipton, Yarrow	4:08
13.	"Sch... Kleines Baby (Hush, Little Baby)"	Siegel, Coster, Dietrich	2:31
14.	"Wenn Der Sommer Wieder Einzieht"	Robertson, Weldon, Cavanaugh, Metzl	3:03
15.	"Marie, Marie"	Becaud, Colpet	4:35
16.	"Wenn Ich Mir Was Wünschen Dürfte"	Hollaender	3:23
17.	"Auf Der Mundharmonika"	Spoliansky, Gilbert	2:39
18.	"Lili Marleen"	Leip, Schultze	2:58
19.	"In Den Kasernen"	Koch, Gérard	3:13
20.	"Sag Mir, Wo Die Blumen Sind"	Colpet, Seeger	3:36
21.	"Die Antwort weiß Ganz Allein Der Wind"	Dylan, Bradtke	3:58
22.	"Ich Werde Dich Lieben (Theme For Young Lovers)"	Welch, Dietrich	2:46
23.	"Ich Hab' Noch Einen Koffer In Berlin"	Pinelli, Siegel	3:03
24.	"Mutter, Hast Du Mir Vergeben"	Niemon, Grau, Dietrich	4:11
25.	"Der Trommelmann (Little Drummer Boy)"	Buschor, Simeone, Onorati, Davis	2:42

== Personnel ==
Credits adapted from the box set Der Blonde Engel – Die Retrospektive (EMI, 7243 5 37567 2 7).

Production

- Concept and consulting – Michels Music Consulting, Hamburg
- Compilation – Wolfgang Michels
- Research and track selection – Wolfgang Michels, Viktor Rotthaler
- Assistance – Regina Sommerfeld
- Digital editing, restoration & remastering – John Cremer, Jens Müller-Koslowski (Railroad Tracks, Kerpen)
- Liner notes – Michael Köhler
- Artwork & design – Michael Narten Artwork, Hannover
- Project management – Gert Gliniorz (EMI Electrola, Cologne)

Acknowledgments

- Christine Bauer
- Heinz Beck
- Doug Drohan
- Jack Kreisberg
- Wolfgang Maier
- Friedrich Wilhelm Murnau Stiftung (Friedemann Beyer)
- Silke Ronneburg & Frieder Roth
- Dr. Horst Königstein
- Martin Reichhold

Special thanks

- Werner Sudendorf
- Filmmuseum Berlin – Marlene Dietrich Collection

Photo credits

- Filmmuseum Berlin – Marlene Dietrich Collection
- EMI Electrola Archive
- Köster (cover)
- Peter Nürnberg (p. 2)
- dpa (pp. 9, 14)
- John Engstead (p. 12)
- Egon Wolff (p. 20)

== Charts ==
Weekly chart for Der Blonde Engel – 25 Lieder
Chart (2002)	Peak position
German Albums (Offizielle Top 100)	98

== See also ==
- Marlene Dietrich discography
