= The Boys in the Back Room =

The Boys in the Back Room may refer to:

- The Boys in the Back Room, 1937 novel by Jules Romains
- "The Boys in the Back Room", 1939 song by Frank Loesser and Frederick Hollander
- The Boys in the Back Room, 1941 collection of essays by Edmund Wilson
