= The Ultimate Collection (Marlene Dietrich album) =

Compilation album by Marlene Dietrich
- Released: November 27, 2015
- Recorded: 1928–1978
- Genre: Traditional pop, cabaret
- Length: 142:13
- Label: Universal Music GmbH

Marlene Dietrich chronology
Love Songs (2004)	The Ultimate Collection (2015)	Marlene Dietrich (2022)

The Ultimate Collection is a compilation album by German–American actress and singer Marlene Dietrich, released in November 27, 2015 by Universal Music. The double compact disc (CD) set presents a comprehensive anthology of Dietrich’s musical career, covering five decades of studio and live recordings from 1928 to 1978, tracing her early Berlin revue performances and her work in The Blue Angel (1930) to her later concert tours and international recordings.

Issued in chronological order, the set was produced from restored sources and newly remastered masters, and includes a 32-page booklet featuring rare photographs and detailed liner notes. Additionally, it includes 14 previously unreleased songs.

The album has been noted by critics and film historians as one of the most complete overviews of Dietrich’s recording legacy.

== Album details ==
The Ultimate Collection is a career-spanning anthology, presenting a chronological overview of Marlene Dietrich musical work from 1928 to 1978. The set compiles studio and live recordings originally issued in Germany, France, the United Kingdom, and the United States, including material from her early revue appearances in Berlin, her exile years in Paris during the 1930s, and her later international concert tours. The compilation was produced from restored sources and newly transferred masters. The first disc, titled "A German-European Star", focuses on her early European recordings and studio sessions, while the second, "An International Icon / Live On Stage – Unreleased Live Tracks", features her later international repertoire and live performances, including 14 previously unreleased concert material. The release included a 32-page booklet accompanying the discs.

== Recording ==
Marlene Dietrich's phonographic journey, as compiled in this album, begins in the German Electrola studios in 1928. The earliest tracks, "Die Kleptomanen" and "Wenn die beste Freundin," were recorded in June 1928 as part of a pot-pourri (Electrola EH-146) from the revue Es Liegt in der Luft, featuring the theatre orchestra and composer Mischa Spoliansky at the piano. "Wenn die beste Freundin" was also released as the A-side of single EG-892, a duet with Margo Lion. The era of The Blue Angel (1930) is represented by a series of foundational sessions. In January 1930, in Berlin, Dietrich recorded "Nimm dich in Acht vor blonden Fraun" (Electrola EG-1170) and its English version, "Blonde Women" (His Master's Voice B 3524). Shortly after, in February 1930, she returned to the studio to record "Ich bin die fesche Lola" (Electrola EG 1802), "Kinder, heut' abend da such' ich mir was aus" (the B-side of the same single), and "Ich bin von Kopf bis Fuss auf Liebe eingestellt" (Electrola EG 1770). The song "Wenn ich mir was wünschen dürfte" (Electrola 2265) dates from the same fertile February session.

The subsequent period, already under the shadow of the Nazi rise to power, saw Dietrich recording in Paris. In July 1933, during the Polydor sessions, "Allein in einer großen Stadt" (Polydor 530001) and its B-side, "Mein blondes Baby", were recorded there, as were "Ja, so bin ich" (Polydor 524182) and "Wo ist der Mann?" (Polydor 47199). The March 1931 session in Berlin, which had already produced "Peter" and "Jonny" (both on single Polydor 522751), also yielded "Leben ohne Liebe kannst du nicht" (Electrola EG 2285) and the French-language single "Quand l'amour meurt" / "Give Me The Man" (Electrola EG 2775). The transition to an international career is marked by recordings in English. In Los Angeles, in 1939, accompanied by Victor Young's orchestra for Decca, she revisited "Falling in Love Again" (Decca 23141) and recorded "The Boys in the Back Room" (Decca 23140).

Selections from the 1940s and 1950s illustrate her association with film and her support for the Allied forces during the Second World War. Among these are "Lili Marleen" (Decca 23456), performed for American soldiers, and recorded in September 1945, in New York, and "Illusions" (Decca 24582), composed by Friedrich Hollaender for Billy Wilder's 1948 film A Foreign Affair. The London recording "Qui me délivrera" (1955) pays tribute to the French chanson. Those three songs appear out of chronological order in the CD track listing.

The album's repertoire further shows her capacity for reinvention in the 1960s. In May 1960, during her concert tour in Germany, studio recordings were made for new versions of "Ich bin von Kopf bis Fuß auf Liebe eingestellt" and "Ich weiß nicht, zu wem ich gehöre", released on the album Wiedersehen mit Marlene (Capitol T10282). Finally, the 1964 studio sessions, which produced the album Die neue Marlene, yielded interpretations of American folk and protest songs, such as "Sag mir, wo die Blumen sind" (the German version of "Where Have All the Flowers Gone?") and "Die Antwort weiß ganz allein der Wind" ("Blowin' In The Wind"), along with "Paff, der Zauberdrachen" ("Puff The Magic Dragon"). The last song, "Just a Gigolo" featured accompaniment by her personal pianist, Raymond, and was recorded in 1978.

The tracks 9 to 22 from the second disc comprise previously unreleased live recordings captured during some of Dietrich's most celebrated concert appearances in Las Vegas, Chicago, London, and Paris, spanning from 1960 to 1971. The earliest performances include "Don't Take Your Guns to Town", "Lili Marleen", "Makin' Whoopee", "I've Grown Accustomed to Her Face", and "I May Never Go Home Anymore", all recorded in January 1960 at the Sahara Hotel in Las Vegas, with orchestra conducted by Burt Bacharach. Additional selections such as "What Am I Bid for My Apple" and "I Refuse to Rock'n Roll" were taped in October 1965 during Dietrich's Las Vegas engagement, under the musical direction of Cee Davidson. Later recordings document Dietrich's international tours of the 1960s and early 1970s. "Moon River", captured in May 1962 at the Olympia in Paris, features Bacharach's arrangements in one of their final collaborations before he resumed his solo career. "Till There Was You", "Happiness Is Just a Thing Called Joe", and "Miss Otis Regrets" were recorded live on 6 December 1963 at the Arie Crown Theatre in Chicago, again with Bacharach conducting. The final three performances ("Boomerang Baby", "La Vie en rose", and "Sentimental Journey") were recorded on 15 September 1971 at the Theatre Royal Drury Lane in London, conducted by William Blezard, Dietrich's long-time accompanist.

== Critical reception ==
In his Brenton Film article, "Josef von Sternberg Collectors Guide: The Blue Angel (1930)," Brent Reid cited the album as one of three CDs that offer superb recordings of the songs from the 1930 classic.

== Track listing ==
Disc 1 – A German-European Star
No.	Title	Writer(s)	Length
1.	"Die Kleptomanen"	Marcellus Schiffer, Mischa Spoliansky	1:21
2.	"Wenn die beste Freundin"	M. Spoliansky	3:12
3.	"Ich bin die fesche Lola"	Friedrich Hollaender	2:37
4.	"Nimm Dich in Acht vor blonden Frau'n"	F. Hollaender	3:15
5.	"Kinder, heut' Abend da such' ich mir was aus"	F. Hollaender	2:42
6.	"Quand l'amour meurt"	Octave Crémieux	3:11
7.	"Give Me the Man"	Karl Hajos, Leo Robin	3:10
8.	"Wo ist der Mann"	Peter Kreuder	3:12
9.	"Ja, so bin ich"	Robert Stolz	3:07
10.	"Johnny, wenn Du Geburtstag hast"	F. Hollaender	2:59
11.	"Peter"	Rudolf Nelson	3:22
12.	"Mein blondes Baby"	Peter Kreuder	3:17
13.	"Allein in einer grossen Stadt"	Franz Waxman	3:48
14.	"Wenn ich mir was wünschen dürfte"	F. Hollaender	1:57
15.	"Ton Regard"	Roger Dumas	3:12
16.	"Assez"	Wal Berg, Emil Stern	3:29
17.	"Leben ohne Liebe kannst du nicht"	M. Spoliansky	3:07
18.	"Moi, je m'ennuie"	W. Berg	3:14
19.	"Qui me delivera"	Nicole Louvier	2:52
20.	"Illusions"	F. Hollander	3:22
21.	"Ich bin von Kopf bis Fuss auf Liebe eingestellt"	F. Hollaender	3:25
22.	"Lili Marlene"	Hans Leip, Norbert Schultze	3:22
Total length:			67:17

Disc 2 – An International Icon / Live On Stage – Unreleased Live Tracks
No.	Title	Writer(s)	Length
1.	"Ich bin von Kopf bis Fuß auf Liebe eingestellt"	F. Hollaender	2:40
2.	"Sag' mir, wo die Blumen sind"	Pete Seeger	3:38
3.	"Blowin' in the Wind"	Bob Dylan	4:03
4.	"Paff, der Zauberdrachen"	Leonard Lipton, Peter Yarrow	4:10
5.	"Ich weiß nicht, zu wem ich gehöre"	F. Hollaender, Robert Liebmann	2:30
6.	"Ich hab' noch einen Koffer in Berlin"	Ralph Maria Siegel	3:05
7.	"Die Welt war jung"	Philippe Gérard	3:23
8.	"Just a Gigolo"	Julius Brammer, Irving Caesar, Leonello Casucci	3:26
9.	"What Am I Bid for My Apple"	Karl Hajos	1:17
10.	"I Refuse to Rock'n Roll"	Nicholas Brodszky, Sammy Cahn	5:46
11.	"Don't Take Your Guns to Town"	Johnny Cash	3:34
12.	"Lili Marleen (Live)"	H. Leip, N. Schultze	4:06
13.	"Makin' Whoopee"	Walter Donaldson, Gus Kahn	3:32
14.	"I've Grown Accustomed to Her Face"	Alan Jay Lerner, Frederick Loewe	3:44
15.	"I May Never Go Home Anymore"	Burt Bacharach, Jack Brooks, Ralph Arthur Roberts	2:22
16.	"Moon River"	Henry Mancini, Johnny Mercer	3:12
17.	"Till There Was You"	Meredith Willson	3:31
18.	"Happiness Is Just a Thing Called Joe"	Harold Arlen, B. Bacharach, E.Y. "Yip" Harburg	3:16
19.	"Miss Otis Regrets"	Cole Porter	3:26
20.	"Boomerang Baby"	Charles Marawood	2:50
21.	"La Vie en rose"	Louiguy, Édith Piaf	3:21
22.	"Sentimental Journey"	Les Brown, Bud Green, Ben Homer	4:05
Total length:			74:56

== Personnel ==
Credits adapted from the liner notes of the 2015 CD The Ultimate Collection (Universal Music, 0600753651483).

- In cooperation with Deutsche Kinemathek – Marlene Dietrich Collection Berlin
- Project Management: Martin Dirnberger
- Compilation: Werner Sudendorf
- Art Direction: Matt Read
- Cover Illustration: Mark Cartledge

== Release history ==
Country	Date	Label	Ref.
Germany	November 27, 2015	Universal Music	
Netherlands	November 27, 2015	Universal Music	

== See also ==
- Marlene Dietrich discography
