= The Best of Marlene Dietrich (1985 album) =

Compilation album by Marlene Dietrich
- Released: August 1985
- Recorded: 1960–1965
- Genres: Traditional pop, cabaret
- Label: EMI

Marlene Dietrich chronology
The Legendary, Lovely Marlene (1982)	The Best of Marlene Dietrich (1985)	The Essential Marlene Dietrich (1991)

The Best of Marlene Dietrich is a compilation album by German-American singer and actress Marlene Dietrich, released by EMI Records in August 1985. The collection features twenty songs originally recorded by Dietrich during the 1960s, from various studio albums and singles, including eleven tracks from the 1960 album Wiedersehen mit Marlene, and four songs from the 1964 album Die neue Marlene, recorded in London with German-language repertoire.

The compilation received a favorable review from Music Week, which described Dietrich's voice as "evocative" and highlighted her rendition of "Where Have All the Flowers Gone?" as a standout track.

== Album details ==
The Best of Marlene Dietrich includes eleven of the thirteen songs from Wiedersehen mit Marlene, which was produced by Dave Dexter Jr., with music arranged and conducted by the singer's longtime musical director, Burt Bacharach. 'Wiedersehen' was marketed as a live album recorded during Dietrich's controversial concert tour in West Germany. However, the recordings were actually made in a studio with audience applause from the tour performances later overdubbed onto the tracks. It was first released on the Electrola label in Germany and was subsequently issued by Capitol Records in the United States with a slightly altered track listing.

The compilation also includes the songs "Where Have All the Flowers Gone?" and "Blowin' in the Wind", originally released as the single (His Master's Voice – POP 1379). The former is a folk song written by Pete Seeger in 1955, inspired by the Cossack folk song "Koloda-Duda" and adapted to an Irish melody. It was later inducted into the Grammy Hall of Fame in 2002. According to Billboard, Dietrich first recorded the song in English in London in 1963 under the direction of Norman Newell. Dissatisfied with the result, she re-recorded the vocals in Paris, before the single's eventual Australian release in December 1965. Cash Box gave the song a "B" rating. According to Record Mirror, "Where Have All the Flowers Gone?" features "a delicate sort of arangement" by Bacharach, while Dietrich delivers a "pleasant" interpretation of Pete Seeger's composition that was considered "very effective in a gentle way" and "professionally sung".

Additionally, the compilation featured four tracks from the album Die neue Marlene: "Sch, Kleines Baby," "Wenn Der Sommer Weider Einzieht," "Ich Werde Dich Lieben," and "Wenn Die Soldaten." Recorded in London, the original album marked a departure from her previous work by focusing on a repertoire of German-language songs, including folk adaptations. Its title (translation: "The New Marlene") reflects a new musical direction, with most arrangements made without Burt Bacharach.

The three remaining songs were released as singles and on EPs in the 1960s. "Die Welt War Jung (Le Chevalier De Paris)" was featured as the B-side to "Sag Mir Wo Die Blumen Sind" (Electrola – E 22 180). Additionally, "Cherchez La Rose" and "Dejeuner Du Matin" were included on the 1962 French EP Marlène (La Voix De Son Maître – EGF 597).

== Critical reception ==
Professional ratings
Review scores
Source	Rating
Music Week	3/5 stars

Music Week wrote that The Best of Marlene Dietrich is an "an excellent memento of a unique star", and described Dietrich's voice as "marvellously evocative of classic old movies and inter-war cabaret clubs", adding that the predominance of German-language songs "won't deter older generations" of buying it.

== Track listing ==
The Best of Marlene Dietrich – Side A
No.	Title	Writer(s)	English translation	Length
1.	"Ich Bin Von Kopf Bis Fuss Auf Liebe Eingestellt"	Hollander	Falling In Love Again
2.	"Ich Bin Die Fesche Lola"	Hollander, Liebmann	I'm Naughty Little Lola
3.	"Kinder, Heut Abend"	Hollander, Liebmann	Children, This Evening
4.	"Mein Blondes Baby"	Rotter, Krender	My Blond Baby
5.	"Jonny, Wenn Du Geburstag Hast"	Hollander	Johnny, When Is Your Birthday
6.	"Peter"	Hollander, Nelson
7.	"Wer Wird Denn Weinen"	Rebner, Hirsch
8.	"Ich Weiss Nicht Zu Wem Ich Gehore"	Hollander	I Don't Know Who I Belong To
9.	"Lili Marleen"	Leip, Schultze	Lilli Marlene
10.	"Allein In Einer Grossen Stadt"	Waxman, Kolpe	Alone In A Big City

The Best of Marlene Dietrich – Side B
No.	Title	Writer(s)	English translation	Length
11.	"Where Have All the Flowers Gone?"	Seeger
12.	"Sch, Kleines Baby"	Siegel, Costa, Dietrich	Hush, Little Baby
13.	"Cherchez La Rose"	Salvador, Rouzard	I'm Looking For A Rose
14.	"Wenn Der Sommer Weider Einzieht"	Robertson, Weldon, Cavanaugh, Metzl	A Little On The Lonely Side
15.	"Ich Werde Dich Lieben"	Bruce Welch, Dietrich	Theme For Young Lovers
16.	"Blowin' In The Wind"	Dylon, Bradtke
17.	"Die Welt War Jung"	Colpe, Philippe-Gerad	When The World Was Young
18.	"Dejeuner Du Matin"	Prevert, Kosma
19.	"Wenn Die Soldaten"	Pronk, Trad.	When The Soldiers
20.	"Ich Hab Noch Einen Koffer In Berlin"	Pinelli, Siegel	I Still Have A Trunk In Berlin

== Personnel ==
Credits adapted from the box set The Best of Marlene (EMI, catalog no. ED 2606771).

- Artwork by Helnwein
- Compilation producer – Chris Ellis
- Coordinator – Karin Pratt
- Liner notes – Peter Gammond

== See also ==
- Marlene Dietrich discography
