= The Essential Marlene Dietrich =

Compilation album by Marlene Dietrich
- Released: 1991
- Recorded: 1930–1965
- Genre: Traditional pop
- Label: EMI

Marlene Dietrich chronology
The Best of Marlene Dietrich (1985)	The Essential Marlene Dietrich (1991)	On Screen, Stage and Radio (1992)

The Essential Marlene Dietrich is a compilation album by German-American actress and singer Marlene Dietrich, released in 1991 by EMI (catalog no. CDP 7 96450 2). It gathers recordings from various phases of her career, from songs of her early 1930s films to her interpretations of American folk music from the 1950s and 60s.

The selection includes her most iconic songs like "Falling in Love Again" and "Lili Marlene" alongside covers of composers like Bob Dylan and Pete Seeger. The album was remastered from original 78 rpm recordings. Its release, coinciding with the Gulf War, led to a last-minute tracklist change to include the pacifist anthem "Where Have All the Flowers Gone?". It surpassed commercial expectations and its cover art influenced k.d. lang's Ingénue.

== Background and release ==
The project was first conceived in August 1990, initially under the working title Marlene: My Favourite Songs. The track selection was compiled by Marlene Dietrich herself, who sent a list of her favorite songs, typed out in order of preference by her friend Mrs. Colpet. However, for copyright reasons, not all the songs from this original list could be included, forcing a change in the repertoire and the final title to The Essential Marlene Dietrich.

The album production involved a complex and costly technical process, consisting of transcribing and remastering original 78 rpm recordings to eliminate surface noise and achieve a quality standard compatible with modern compact discs (CDs). The booklet contains a biographical text about the artist. In a conversation between the singer and David Bret (who wrote its liner notes) on February 8, 1991, Dietrich suggested a specific alteration to his text: she asked that the reference "the last war" be changed to "the Second World War", arguing that, from her point of view, the "last war" was in fact the ongoing conflict in the Gulf.

The geopolitical context resulted in a last-minute alteration to the tracklist to include the French version of "Where Have All the Flowers Gone?", titled "Ôu vont les fleurs?", with lyrics by Francis Lemarque. The inclusion of the song was a way to highlight her role as a voice for world peace. Another song included on the album is her 1962 recording of "Le Déjeuner du matin", composed by Joseph Kosma with lyrics by Jacques Prévert, which Dietrich mentioned in interviews as one of her favorites, despite claiming that she rarely listened to her own records.

== Critical reception ==
Professional ratings
Review scores
Source	Rating
AllMusic	4.5/5 stars

The All Music Guide (1994) described the album as "the best Marlene Dietrich collection available".

Music Week, the critic praised the compilation, describing it as "perfectly titled". In a comparative analysis with other EMI reissues in the same style, such as Berlin By Night (catalog no. 7963312) and various French music compilations, he positioned Dietrich's album as one of the strong entries in the series, validating the track selection as truly essential to representing the artist. In a later review, the same magazine included The Essential in a roundup of reissued classic vocal albums. While noting that Marlene Dietrich, like Vera Lynn, had "no real vocal influence on the present", the review stated that the compilation was "even better" than a concurrent Vera Lynn release and described it as "a selection of recordings that suggest, even if they don't quite capture, the mystique" of the artist.

The critic from the Scripps Howard News Service held a divided opinion on the album. They praised the early German-language recordings from 1930 and 1931, describing them as great. In contrast, they viewed the 1960s recordings that made up the rest of the album less favorably, referring to them as a mixed bag and specifically identifying the renditions of "Blowin' in the Wind" and "Where Have All the Flowers Gone" as low points. Their overall conclusion was that, unless a listener understood German, this particular collection might not have been considered essential.

== Commercial performance ==
Although specific sales figures, such as the number of copies sold, were not publicly disclosed, the album's commercial performance exceeded the initial expectations of both Dietrich and her collaborator, David Bret.

== Legacy ==
The album and its visual imagery exerted a significant influence beyond Dietrich's own work. During the production of her acclaimed album Ingénue (1992), Canadian singer k.d. lang was profoundly influenced by the German artist, so much so that Ben Mink, her producer and collaborator, described Dietrich as a "huge vocal influence" for lang at that time. This admiration extended to the visual realm: the cover art for Ingénue is considered a direct homage to the cover of The Essential Marlene Dietrich. Both share a sepia color palette and the use of a similar thin-lined font. The primary pose of lang on the cover, gazing downward, also directly echoes Dietrich's pose on her album. Mink even characterized the sound of Ingénue as a "post-nuclear cabaret", a description that resonates with the aesthetic associated with Dietrich's repertoire.

== Track listing ==
The Essential Marlene Dietrich
No.	Title	Writer(s)	Length
1.	"Ich Bin Von Kopf Bis Fuss Auf Liebe Eingestellt (Falling In Love Again)"	Hollaender	3:04
2.	"Quand L'Amour Meurt"	Robin, Cremieux	3:12
3.	"Give Me The Man"	Robin, Cremieux	3:09
4.	"Leben Ohne Liebe"	Spoliansky, Gilbert	3:07
5.	"Mein Blondes Baby"	Rotter, Kreuder	3:55
6.	"Allein In Einer Grossen Stadt"	Wachsmann, Colpet	5:00
7.	"Peter"	Hollaender, Nelson	3:26
8.	"Lola"	Hollaender, Liebmann	1:37
9.	"Wer Wird Denn Weinen"	Rebner, Hirsh	1:06
10.	"Johnny, Wenn Du Geburstag Hast"	Hollaender	2:55
11.	"Lili Marlene"	Leip, Schultz	3:01
12.	"Dejeuner Du Matin"	Prevert, Kosma	2:50
13.	"Ou Vont Les Fleurs"	Lemarque, Seeger, Rouzard	3:37
14.	"Wenn Die Soldaten"	Trad., Arr. Pronk	3:03
15.	"In Den Kasernen"	Koch, Gerard, Arr. Rogers	3:15
16.	"Und Wenn Er Wiederkommt"	Maeterlinck, Colpet, Gerard, Arr. Pronk	3:06
17.	"Wenn Der Sommer Wieder Einzieht (A Little On The Lonely Side)"	Robertson, Welden, Cavanaugh, Metcl, Arr. Pronk	3:07
18.	"Blowing In The Wind"	Dylan	4:03
19.	"Die Welt War Jung (When The World Was Young)"	Vannier, Colpet, Phillipe/Gerard	3:24
20.	"Where Have All The Flowers Gone"	Colpet, Seeger, Arr. Bacharach	3:38
21.	"Ich Werde Dich Lieben (Theme From Young Lovers)"	Welch, Dietrich, Arr. Stott	2:49
22.	"Der Trommelmann (The Little Drummerboy)"	Buschor, Simeone, Onorati, Davis, Arr. Pronk	2:45
23.	"Auf Der Mundharmonika"	Spoliansky, Gilbert, Arr. Stott	2:45

== See also ==
- Marlene Dietrich discography
