= At the Café de Paris =

Live album by Marlene Dietrich
- Released: 1954
- Recorded: June 21, 1954
- Genre: Traditional pop
- Label: Columbia Records

Marlene Dietrich chronology
Rosie and Marlene (1953)	At the Café de Paris (1954)	Marlene Dietrich (1957)

At the Café de Paris is a live album by singer and actress Marlene Dietrich, recorded during her 1954 residency at the famous London nightclub. The album captures performances in both English and German, with musical arrangements led by conductor George Smith and introduced by Noël Coward. The debut show at the venue generated significant media attention, and portions of the repertoire were later released on LP by Philips/Columbia.

Different versions were commercially released, varying in tracks and formats. Years later, the album was reissued on compact disc (CD) with some modifications to the original tracklist. Contemporary critics noted both technical aspects of the recording and distinctive qualities of Dietrich's performance.

== Background ==
In preparation for her June 1954 engagement at London's Café de Paris, Marlene Dietrich sought musical accompaniment for her performances. She initially approached pianist Bill McGuffie, but when he was unavailable, colleagues recommended Peter Knight, a noted pianist, arranger, and conductor. At the time, Knight had recently recorded material for English Decca with his ensemble. However, the live performance included in the album was conducted by George Smith.

Dietrich's Café de Paris debut on June 21 generated considerable media attention. The venue orchestrated an extensive press campaign, unprecedented in London nightlife since events involving Princess Margaret. The café hosted a luncheon for journalists, arranging tables with vacant seats marked for Dietrich, though she ultimately did not attend. Management stated this served both to consolidate interviews and compensate critics who would later review her performances without complimentary meals. At the venue Dietrich made an entrance wearing a red suit and hat. Her performance was introduced by Noël Coward, with whom she had previously collaborated. During this London engagement, Dietrich recorded two albums for Philips/Columbia - one in English and one in German. The label also reportedly considered recording her opening night performance and released material related to her film work. In July 24, Billboard reported that Dietrich's opening performance at the Cafe de Paris has been waxed on LP by Phillips.

The album includes a performance of "Look Me Over Closely" which was released as a single after her previous album, Marlene Dietrich Overseas (1952). Billboard gave it a score of 73.

== Album details ==
Issued on LP by Columbia Records (catalog no. ML 4975) and Philips (BO 7684 R), as well as on Columbia EP A-1115 (three 7-inch 45 rpm records in a heavy cardboard gatefold cover with extensive liner notes). Neither of the Columbia editions includes "Go 'Way from My Window". The original Philips pressing omits "Lazy Afternoon" and "No Love, No Nothin'". The LP includes a front cover with a full-color portrait, a back cover with the famous photograph of the singer in her sheer gown, and an inner sleeve with excerpts from the London press. The package also received an unusual detail: it was scented with Arpège by Lanvin. The album was later released on CD as The Marlene Dietrich Album (Sony MDK 47254).

The so-called "live" version of "No Love, No Nothin'" appearing on both the LP and CD issues is, in fact, a studio recording with added audience applause, most likely inserted to extend the running time of the original 12-inch U.S. LP. The unaltered studio version, without overdubbed applause, was first made available on the 1993 Sony Music CD The Cosmopolitan Marlene Dietrich. The Sony CD reissue of The Marlene Dietrich Album omits both "Go 'Way from My Window" and "Das Lied ist aus".

== Critical reception ==
Professional ratings
Review scores
Source	Rating
Allmusic	2/5 stars
The Encyclopedia of Popular Music	4/5 stars

Cash Box described the album as "another masterpiece", highlighting the "excellent selection of material" and the "unbeatable Dietrich technique", and calling it "an exciting package that should do a real big job", as well as "a fine recording for such poor recording conditions".

The Oregonian, reviewing The Marlene Dietrich Album, described the album as a seductive collection, noting Dietrich's "veiled voice and beckoning half-whisper" that "promised seduction with every breath", and calling it "an unusual holiday gift that will bring great delights".

== Track listing ==
No.	Title	Writer(s)	Length
1.	"Introduction by Noël Coward"		1:53
2.	"La Vie en Rose"	Louiguy / Marguerite Monnot / Édith Piaf	3:03
3.	"The Boys in the Backroom"	Frederick Hollander / Frank Loesser	1:43
4.	"Lazy Afternoon"	John La Touche / Jerome Moross	2:51
5.	"Lola"	Hollander	1:54
6.	"Look Me Over Closely"	Hollander	2:51
7.	"Das Lied Ist Aus (Frag 'Nicht Warum Ich Gehe)"	Robert Stolz / Walter Reisch	3:57
8.	"No Love, No Nothin'"	Harry Warren / Leo Robin
9.	"The Laziest Gal in Town"	Cole Porter	2:31
10.	"Johnny"	Hollander	2:42
11.	"Lili Marlene"	Tommy Connor / Hans Leip / Norbert Schultze	2:56
12.	"Falling in Love Again"	Hollander / Sammy Lerner	3:11

== See also ==
- Marlene Dietrich discography
