= Marlene Dietrich Sings =

Compilation album by Marlene Dietrich
- Released: 1947
- Genre: Traditional pop
- Label: VOX

Marlene Dietrich chronology
Decca Presents Marlene Dietrich (1940)	Marlene Dietrich Sings (1947)	Marlene Dietrich Overseas (1952)

Marlene Dietrich Sings is a compilation album by actress and singer Marlene Dietrich, released in 1947 on Vox Records label. The album features German-language recordings originally released on Polydor masters, with piano accompaniment by Peter Kreuder. The repertoire includes cabaret-style performances associated with post-World War I Europe.

Marlene Dietrich's original 1933 Paris recordings with Peter Kreuder were reissued by Vox in 1947 as three 10-inch 78 RPM shellac singles, then as a 10" LP (1950), featuring German classics like "Jonny" and "Mein blondes Baby", plus added French tracks.

Critics acknowledged Marlene Dietrich's album as a period piece, with some praising its nostalgic value and distinctive vocal style, though often noting its dated production and limited appeal.

== Background and release ==
The recordings feature Marlene Dietrich performing a selection of songs in German and French, accompanied by orchestras led by Peter Kreuder in Paris during July 1933. The tracks include "Jonny", "Peter", "Ja, so bin ich", "Wo ist der Mann?", "Mein blondes Baby", and "Allei... in einer grossen Stadt", with instrumental backing provided by either Orchestra Wal-Berg or Jazz Orchester Freddie Johnson. The sessions took place between July 12 and July 19, 1933, documenting Dietrich's early cabaret-style repertoire before her rise to international fame as a singer.

On August 9, 1947, Billboard listed Marlene Dietrich's upcoming album in its "Advanced Record Releases" section. The album was first released as a three-disc 10-inch set, compiling original recordings made by the singer and actress and released as singles in Germany. It features Dietrich's German-language songs, all tied to her repertoire from Weimar-era cinema and cabaret. The tracks were remastered from original Polydor sources. The album is officially credit in its cover as A Polydor Recording – Spotlight Series: Vox Presents Marlene Dietrich Sings – Accompanied by Peter Kreuder, His Piano and His Orchestra. In 1950, the label reissued the album as a 10" LP, adding the songs "Moi Je M'ennuie" and "Assez" to the tracklist.

== Critical reception ==
Professional ratings
Review scores
Source	Rating
AllMusic	4/5 stars
Billboard	70/100
Down Beat	3/5 stars

James Norwood of The American Record Guide, praised Dietrich "husky, sensual" voice as a vessel for the decadent post-WWI atmosphere. However, he criticizes the lack of translations and the uneven sound quality. While calling the discs "far from perfect", the reviewer concedes their appeal as a relic for devotees.

Regarding the 10" LP reissue, the Billboard stated that there was "real character in these stylings, and most of it has to do with sex", but cautioned that the album was "very specialized" and that "several numbers are undoubtedly blue".

Down Beat wrote that Dietrich "reeks, Summons-style" and that these recordings "have nothing to do with singing", describing them instead as a parody of European café singing. However, the review concluded that "if you have the album, you’ll keep it".

Carter Harmar of The New York Times wrote that Vox Records "has done the public a favor by re-pressing the Polydor masters of Marlene Dietrich", highlighting performances that had been unavailable in the U.S. for years. He added that listeners interested in Dietrich or in the "demimonde life of post–World War I Europe" would find the songs "fascinating".

AllMusic critic Bruce Eder noted that the album's eight Polydor recordings are "surprisingly blues- and jazz-influenced", with Dietrich sounding "like a German trying very hard to sound American — and mostly succeeding". He concluded that the material is "delightfully decadent and seductive".

== Track listing ==
Marlene Dietrich Sings

16072 A
No.	Title	Writer(s)	Length
1.	"Jonny"	Hollander

16072 B
No.	Title	Writer(s)	Length
1.	"Peter"	Nelson, Hollander

16073 A
No.	Title	Writer(s)	Length
1.	"Allein... In Einer Grossen Stadt"	Waschsmann, Kolpe

16073 B
No.	Title	Writer(s)	Length
1.	"Mein Blonde Baby"	Kreuder, Rotter

16074 A
No.	Title	Writer(s)	Length
1.	"Ja, So Bin Ich"	Stolz, Reisch

16074 B
No.	Title	Writer(s)	Length
1.	"Wo Ist Der Mann?"	Kreuder, Kolpe

Marlene Dietrich Sings

Side A
No.	Title	Writer(s)	Length
1.	"Jonny"	Hollander
2.	"Peter"	Nelson, Hollander
3.	"Allein... In Einer Grossen Stadt"	Waschsmann, Kolpe
4.	"Mein Blonde Baby"	Kreuder, Rotter

Side B
No.	Title	Writer(s)	Length
1.	"Ja, So Bin Ich"	Stolz, Reisch
2.	"Wo Ist Der Mann?"	Kreuder, Kolpe
3.	"Moi Je M'ennuie"	Wal, Berg, Francois
4.	"Assez"	Wal, Berg, Stern, Tranchant

== See also ==
- Marlene Dietrich discography
