= Mythos und Legende / Myth and Legend =

Compilation album by Marlene Dietrich
- Released: November 17, 1994
- Recorded: 1928–1965
- Genre: Traditional pop, cabaret
- Label: EMI Electrola

Marlene Dietrich chronology
The Cosmopolitan Marlene Dietrich (1993)	Mythos und Legende / Myth and Legend (1994)	Falling in Love Again (1998)

Mythos und Legende / Myth and Legend is a compilation album by German–American actress and singer Marlene Dietrich, released in 1994 by EMI Electrola. The three–compact disc set contains recordings made between the 1920s and the 1960s, presenting a retrospective of Dietrich's career as a vocalist.

Critics regard the compilation as a comprehensive and valuable compilation of the singer's career. According to some critical opinions, the box set stands out for its track selection, sound quality, and variety of song versions.

== Album details ==
Marlene Dietrich's Mythos und Legende is a 3-CD box set released by EMI, spanning approximately 35 years of Dietrich's recordings from the late 1920s to the mid-1960s. The collection features multiple versions of several songs, illustrating changes in arrangements over time as well as the singer's artistic development. The famous song "Falling in Love Again" appears in four versions, including early recordings and a previously lost version.

Each CD includes a booklet documenting recording details and historical context, and the set also comes with a separate booklet for the slipcase that provides a short biography of Dietrich, key dates, and milestones in her life. The compilation highlights both popular songs and rare recordings, offering a comprehensive overview of Dietrich's musical career for listeners and collectors.

== Critical reception ==
Professional ratings
Review scores
Source	Rating
The Encyclopedia of Popular Music	4/5 stars

Critic Michael Boldhaus of Cinemusic.de gave a positive assessment of the compilation, highlighting that the 3-CD edition provides a comprehensive overview of Dietrich's musical career. He praised the track selection, sound quality, and the variety of song versions.

Critic Helmut Braun of Deutschlandfunk, discussing the repression of musicians and artists during the Nazi regime, mentions Marlene Dietrich: Mythos und Legende as a record of Dietrich's career and cultural significance. The album is cited as a documentation of Dietrich's trajectory, showcasing her musical legacy and the relevance of her recordings in the cultural landscape of the time.

In an article published in the German magazine Du, the critic states that about the singer "one should no longer say very much", since everything about her "has already been said countless times". Even so, he notes that the song "Sch..., Kleines Baby" reaffirms her artistic persona by turning an "apparently naive" lyric into an exercise in irony and interpretive distance.

== Track listing ==
Mythos und Legende – Disc 1
No.	Title	Writer(s)	Length
1.	"Es Liegt in Der Luft (Potpourri)"	Mischa Spoliansky, Marcellus Schiffer	8:23
2.	"Wenn Die Beste Freundin"	Mischa Spoliansky, Marcellus Schiffer	3:08
3.	"Ich bin von Kopf bis Fuß auf Liebe eingestellt"	Friedrich Hollaender	3:21
4.	"Ich bin von Kopf bis Fuß auf Liebe eingestellt"	Friedrich Hollaender	3:00
5.	"Nimm Dich in Acht Vor Blonden Frau'n"	Friedrich Hollaender	3:10
6.	"Ich Bin Die Fesche Lola"	Friedrich Hollaender, Robert Liebmann	2:34
7.	"Kinder, Heut' Abend da Such Ich Mir Was Aus"	Friedrich Hollaender, Robert Liebmann	2:39
8.	"Wenn Ich Mir Was Wünschen Dürfte"	Friedrich Hollaender	1:53
9.	"Leben Ohne Liebe Kannst du Nicht"	R. Gilbert, Mischa Spoliansky	3:01
10.	"Peter (Chanson)"	Rudolf Nelson, Friedrich Hollaender	3:17
11.	"Jonny"	Friedrich Hollaender	3:07
12.	"Jonny"	Friedrich Hollaender	2:57
13.	"Ja So Bin Ich"	Robert Stolz, Walter Reisch	3:03
14.	"Mein Blondes Baby"	Peter Kreuder	3:14
15.	"Allein in Einer Grossen Stadt"	Franz Waxman, Max Colpet	3:44
16.	"Wo Ist Der Mann?"	Max Colpet, Peter Kreuder	3:09
17.	"Falling in Love Again"	Frederick Hollander, Sammy Lerner	3:09
18.	"Blonde Women"	Friedrich Hollaender, Frank Conelly	3:12
19.	"Quand l'Amour Meurt"	Octave Crémieux, Leo Robin	3:07
20.	"Give Me the Man"	Octave Crémieux, Leo Robin	3:05

Mythos und Legende – Disc 2
No.	Title	Writer(s)	Length
1.	"I Am the Naughty Lola"	Friedrich Hollaender, Frank Conelly	2:31
2.	"Assez"	Wal Berg, Emil Stern, Jean Tranchant	3:26
3.	"Moi, Je M'Ennuie"	Wal Berg, Camille François	3:11
4.	"Cherche la Rose"	René Rouzaud, Henri Salvador	3:52
5.	"Ou Vont Les Fleurs"	René Rouzaud, Pete Seeger	3:34
6.	"Marie, Marie"	Gilbert Bécaud	4:30
7.	"Déjeuner du Matin"	Joseph Kosma, Jacques Prévert	2:45
8.	"Where Have All the Flowers Gone"	Pete Seeger	3:34
9.	"Blowin' in the Wind"	Bob Dylan	4:00
10.	"Wer Wird Denn Weinen, Wenn Man Auseinander Geht"	Hugo Hirsch, Arthur Rebner	1:01
11.	"Mein Blondes Baby"	Peter Kreuder, Fritz Rotter	3:53
12.	"Peter"	Friedrich Hollaender, Rudolf Nelson	3:23
13.	"Allein in Einer Grossen Stadt"	Franz Waxman, Max Colpet	4:52
14.	"Ich Bin Die Fesche Lola"	Friedrich Hollaender, Robert Liebmann	1:32
15.	"Wenn Ich Mir Was Wünschen Dürfte"	Friedrich Hollaender	3:18
16.	"Johnny, Wenn du Geburtstag Hast"	Friedrich Hollaender	2:52
17.	"Marie, Marie"	Gilbert Bécaud, Max Colpet	4:39
18.	"Lili Marleen"	Hans Leip, Norbert Schultze	2:57

Mythos und Legende – Disc 3
No.	Title	Writer(s)	Length
1.	"Ich Weiss Nicht, Zu Wem Ich Gehöre"	Friedrich Hollaender, Robert Liebmann	2:20
2.	"Ich Hab' Noch Einen Koffer in Berlin"	R. M. Siegel, Aldo V. Pinelli	2:58
3.	"Kinder, Heut' Abend, Da Such Ich Mir Was Aus"	Friedrich Hollaender	2:04
4.	"Sag' Mir, Wo Die Blumen Sind"	Max Colpet, Pete Seeger	3:34
5.	"Die Welt War Jung (Le Chevalier de Paris)"	M. Phillippe-Gerarde, Max Colpet	3:20
6.	"Die Antwort Weiss Ganz Allein Der Wind"	Hans Bradtke, Bob Dylan	3:57
7.	"Paff, Der Zauberdrachen"	Leonard Lipton, Peter Yarrow	4:06
8.	"Wenn Die Soldaten..."	Traditional	2:59
9.	"In Den Kasernen"	Gérard, Korch	3:11
10.	"Und Wenn Er Wiederkommt"	Gérard, Max Colpet, Maeterlinck	3:01
11.	"Auf Der Mundharmonika"	R. Gilbert, Mischa Spoliansky	2:38
12.	"Der Trommelmann ("The Little Drummer Boy")"	Georg Buschor, Simsone, Henry Onorati	2:41
13.	"Wenn Der Sommer Wieder Einzieht"	Cavanaugh, Weldon, Robertson, Metlz	3:02
14.	"Ich Werde Dich Lieben ("Theme for Young Lovers")"	Bruce Welch, Marlene Dietrich	2:46
15.	"SCH... , Kleines Baby ("Hush, Little Baby")"	Siegel, Coster, Marlene Dietrich	2:29
16.	"Mutter, Hast du Mir Vergeben"	Czesław Niemen, Grau, Marlene Dietrich	4:09
17.	"Ich Bin Von Kopf Bis Fuss Auf Liebe Eingestellt"	Friedrich Hollaender	2:34

== Personnel ==
Credits adapted from the liner notes of Mythos Und Legende / Myth And Legend box set (EMI Electrola, catalog no. 8 31420 2)

- Album Coordinator: Günter Wehrke
- Special Thanks: Jens-Uwe Völmeke
- Audio Remastering: MAARWEG-Studio, Cologne
- NO NOISE® Process: Sonic Solutions

== See also ==
- Marlene Dietrich discography
