= Love Songs (Marlene Dietrich album) =

Compilation album by Marlene Dietrich
- Released: December 28, 2004
- Recorded: 1930–1959
- Genre: Traditional pop, cabaret
- Label: Columbia

Marlene Dietrich chronology
Der Blonde Engel – Die Retrospektive (2001)	Love Songs (2004)	The Ultimate Collection (2015)

Love Songs is a compilation album by German-American singer and actress Marlene Dietrich, released on 28 December 2004 by Columbia Records (catalog no. CK 93565). Part of Columbia's Love Songs series, the album features 14 tracks recorded between 1930 and 1959, highlighting performances in both English and German. It includes early Berlin recordings as well as later cabaret-style renditions of classics such as "Falling in Love Again", "Lili Marlene", "La Vie en rose" and "One for My Baby".

Reviewers highlighted Fietrich's combination of intimacy, theatricality, and cabaret artistry, noting that the compilation effectively illustrates the evolution of her career and her lasting influence as a performer. At the same time, some critics pointed out technical imperfections in her vocal delivery and considered certain tracks or the album’s liner notes to be mismatched or excessively elaborate.

== Album details ==
The album was part of a larger series of compilations from the label titled Love Songs, which featured albums by various artists from its catalog, including Chet Baker, Sarah Vaughan, Merle Haggard, and Roy Orbison, aimed at the Valentine's Day market. The album collects 14 tracks spanning 44 minutes and 24 seconds, focusing on Dietrich's recordings that explore themes of romance and amour.

The material on the compilation was recorded between 1930 and 1959, and it includes her early Berlin recordings from the beginning of her career, where her delivery was notably lighter, alongside her later, more famous work characterized by a deeper, spoken-word cabaret style. The track list features English-language renditions of several of her most iconic songs closely associated with her film career, such as "Falling in Love Again" from The Blue Angel (1930).

The album also includes interpretations of American standards, among these are notable performances of Harold Arlen and Johnny Mercer's "One for My Baby (and One More for the Road)," the French classic "La Vie en rose," and the wartime anthem "Lili Marlene," presented here in its English version. The recordings feature lush studio orchestra accompaniments, though specific musician and arranger credits are not provided for this particular collection.

== Critical reception ==
Professional ratings
Review scores
Source	Rating
All About Jazz	1.5/5 stars
The Buffalo News	3/5 stars
Film Score Monthly	2.5/5 stars
Slant Magazine	3/5 stars

Jim Santella, writing for All About Jazz, describes the compilation as defining cabaret for generations, showcasing Dietrich's evolution from a lighter 1930s performer to her lower, more caricatured 1950s persona. While praising the superb orchestras and her unique emotional blend, the critic notes her flawed technical delivery, including pitch problems that hampered her performances—exemplified by a slipped final note in "La Vie en Rose." He highlights a mismatch in "Baubles, Bangles, and Beads," finding her "entirely out of place," but applauds the "superb big band accompaniment" on tracks like "A Guy Who Takes His Time."

Mary Kunz Goldman, of The Buffalo News, highlighted the unique duality of Dietrich, noting that the world's most glamorous woman revealed a "real yearning and vulnerability" in her voice. The critic observed that the artist half-spoke, half-sang tracks like "Love Me" against a soft jazz band, creating an intimate atmosphere. She expressed disappointment that "Lili Marlene" was not in German but praised "Taking a Chance on Love" and deemed Dietrich's interpretation of "Weltschmerz" (world-weariness) on "One For My Baby" perfect. Goldman concluded by recommending that listeners ignore the album's "overwrought, silly liner notes."

Mark Griffin, from Film Score Daily, in his review comparing "Marlene Dietrich: Love Songs" and "Lena Horne: Love Songs", contrasts the two legends, stating that while Horne's collection showcases her versatility and "commanding pipes" in nuanced live performances, Dietrich was not a "legitimate singer" but an "ingeniously self-styled icon" who relied on her own "brand of indelible special delivery". He highlights superior tracks from Dietrich like "One For My Baby", a perfect fit for her "drowsy delivery", but criticizes the "bizarre and heavy handed" liner notes and the floral artwork on both releases, which fail to evoke the art deco ambiance these matchless movie goddesses deserve.

Eric Henderson, of Slant Magazine, frames Love Songs as an "essential tribute to a unique stylist," despite its initially peculiar and "indecent" appeal. He argues that Dietrich's "adenoidal" and distant vocal quality—a kind of "self-defense mechanism"—renders the album unsuitable for romance, suggesting it may only work for "frantic masturbation." Yet he applauds Columbia's embrace of this "masochistic" aesthetic through "delirious" liner notes that mythologize her as a Medusa transmuting love songs into "terrifying ballads piped from the gates of hell." Henderson contrasts her musical persona with her iconic film performances under von Sternberg, noting that only "Baubles, Bangles And Beads" recaptures the aura of "menace" and vulnerability that defined her screen legacy—a track he vividly describes as an "unspeakably drunk wet dream."

Gary Graff of The Plain Dealer highlighted the album and other releases in the same series in his newspaper column, noting that "These romantic collections will be out in time to add a bit of amorous mood to your New Year's celebration".

== Track listing ==
No.	Title	Writer(s)	Length
1.	"Falling in Love Again"	Frederick Hollander, Sammy Lerner	3:10
2.	"Peter, Peter Komm Zu Mir Zurueck"	F. Hollander	3:19
3.	"Jonny" (in German)	Edward Heyman, F. Hollaender	2:59
4.	"Love Me"	Don Raye, Gene de Paul	3:02
5.	"Come Rain or Come Shine"	Harold Arlen, Johnny Mercer	2:58
6.	"A Guy What Takes His Time"	Ralph Rainger	2:44
7.	"Baubles, Bangles and Beads"	Robert Wright, George Forrest	3:23
8.	"La Vie en rose"	Louiguy, Édith Piaf	2:51
9.	"No Love, No Nothin'"	Leo Robin	2:53
10.	"Something I Dreamed Last Night"	Sammy Fain, Herbert Magidson, Jack Yellen	3:31
11.	"One for My Baby"	H. Arlen, J. Mercer	4:06
12.	"Lili Marlene"	Norbert Schultze, Hans Leip, Mack David	3:07
13.	"Taking a Chance on Love" (in German)	Vernon Duke, Ted Fetter, John Latouche	2:34
14.	"Let's Call It a Day"	Lew Brown, Ray Henderson	3:12

== Personnel ==
Credits adapted from AllMusic.

Musicians

- Marlene Dietrich – vocals
- Burt Bacharach – conductor

Production

- Michael Brooks – compilation producer
- Seth Rothstein – project director
- Stacey Boyle – A\&R
- Steven Berkowitz – A\&R
- Darcy Proper – digital mastering
- Harry Coster – digital restoration
- Matt Cavaluzzo – transfers

Artwork

- Nancy Sacks – design

== See also ==
- Marlene Dietrich discography
