= Decca Presents Marlene Dietrich =

Studio album by Marlene Dietrich
- Released: 1940
- Genre: Traditional pop
- Label: Decca

Marlene Dietrich chronology
Decca Presents Marlene Dietrich (1940)	Marlene Dietrich Sings (1947)

Decca Presents Marlene Dietrich (later reissued as Marlene Dietrich Souvenir Album) is the debut album by singer and actress Marlene Dietrich, released in 1940 by Decca Records as part of their Decca Personality Series of box sets.

The album featured songs from her films and personal favorites, recorded in Los Angeles under conductor Victor Young. Originally issued as three 78 RPM singles, it was later reissued with additional tracks, including "Lili Marleen".

Overall, critics praised the album as "the definitive assemblage of the Dietrich into one book", and for vocals that evoked "glamour" and "humor".

== Background and release ==
The songs were recorded in Los Angeles under the direction of conductor Victor Young, with sessions taking place on two separate dates. On December 11, 1939, Dietrich recorded "I’ve Been in Love Before", "You’ve Got That Look," and "Falling in Love Again". Later, on December 19 of the same year, "The Boys in the Backroom", "You Go to My Head" and "You Do Something to Me" were recorded.

Originally released as three 10-inch 78 RPM shellac singles under the official title Decca Presents Marlene Dietrich — New Universal Star — In a Collection of Songs from Her New Universal Pictures, and Her Other Favorites (Decca Album No. 115), the album was later reissued as a 10-inch 78 RPM LP with the addition of two tracks, "Lili Marleen" and "Symphonie", recorded in New York with the orchestra conducted by Charles Magnante on September 7, 1945. The single "Lili Marlene" / "Symphony" was released on October 1945 (catalog no. 23456). The reissue slightly modified the original cover art, updating the title to Marlene Dietrich Souvenir Album, and adding the tracklist to the design. In 1998, the MCA record label reissued all the eight tracks on a compact disc (CD) titled Falling in Love Again.

Billboard announced the release on October 24, 1942, in its "The Week's Records" section, covering records issued between October 13 and 20, retitled Marlene Dietrich Souvenir Album.

== Critical reception ==
Professional ratings
Review scores
Source	Rating
Billboard	73/100

Billboard praised the album, stating that "this package should go over big" and that Marlene Dietrich "manages to be as sexy on wax as she is in the flicks". The Hollywood Reporter reviewed the Souvenir Album on 1948, describing it as "the definitive assemblage of the Dietrich into one book", and highlighting its appeal to collectors who, until then, had only been able to obtain scattered recordings. In his remarks on the album, included in the book Goldmine's Celebrity Vocals: Attempts at Musical Fame from 1500 Major Stars and Supporting Players, Rof Loffman noted that Dietrich's drawling contralto and sophisticated delivery evoked her exotic glamour while also revealing a sense of humor.

== Track listing ==
Decca presents Marlene Dietrich

23139 A
No.	Title	Writer(s)	Length
1.	"I've Been In Love Before"	Frank Loesser, Frederick Hollander

23139 B
No.	Title	Writer(s)	Length
1.	"You Do Something To Me"	Cole Porter

23140 A
No.	Title	Writer(s)	Length
1.	"You've Got That Look"	Loesser, Hollander

23140 B
No.	Title	Writer(s)	Length
1.	"You Go To My Head"	Haven Gillespie, J. Fred Coots

23141 A
No.	Title	Writer(s)	Length
1.	"Falling In Love Again"	Hollander

23141 B
No.	Title	Writer(s)	Length
1.	"The Boys in the Backroom"	Loesser, Hollander

Marlene Dietrich Souvenir Album

Side A
No.	Title	Writer(s)	Length
1.	"Lili Marlene"	Norbert Schultze, Hans Leip, Mack David
2.	"Symphonie"	Alex Alstone, André Tabet, Roger Bernstein
3.	"I've Been In Love Before"	Loesser, Hollander
4.	"You Do Something To Me"	Porter

Side B
No.	Title	Writer(s)	Length
1.	"You've Got That Look (That Makes Me Weak)"	Loesser, Hollander
2.	"You Go To My Head"	Gillespie, Coots
3.	"Falling In Love Again"	Hollander
4.	"The Boys In The Backroom"	Loesser, Hollander

== See also ==
- Marlene Dietrich discography
