= Just a Gigolo (soundtrack) =

Soundtrack album by Various artists
- Released: 1979
- Genre: Film score; soundtrack
- Label: Ariola (GER), Jambo (UK)

Marlene Dietrich chronology
Marlene Dietrich in Deutschland (1976)	Just a Gigolo (1979)	The Legendary, Lovely Marlene (1982)

Singles from Just a Gigolo
- 1. "Just a Gigolo" Released: 1978; 2. "I Kiss Your Hand, Madame" Released: 1978; 3. "Revolutionary Song (Japan only)" Released: 1979

Just a Gigolo is the soundtrack album for the 1978 West German film of the same name, directed by David Hemmings and starring David Bowie, Marlene Dietrich, Curt Jürgens and Kim Novak. The album features period-style vocal and instrumental tracks alongside contemporary 1970s recordings, reflecting the film's setting in post-World War I Berlin.

The soundtrack includes performances by Bowie, The Manhattan Transfer, Pasadena Roof Orchestra, The Ragtimers, and Dietrich. Produced and supervised by Jack Fishman, the album was primarily recorded at Olympic Studios in London and has been reissued in expanded form by Cherry Red Records, including a resequenced tracklist and a 24-page illustrated booklet.

Critics noted the album's distinctive atmosphere and production, highlighting the contributions of multiple artists, while commercially it reached sales of approximately 50,000 copies in the U.K. by mid-1979.

== Background ==
Just a Gigolo was conceived as a major $5 million production by the Berlin-based Leguan Films, starring David Bowie, Marlene Dietrich, Curt Jürgens, and Kim Novak. Bowie followed up his otherworldly performance in The Man Who Fell to Earth (1976) with a more grounded role as Paul Ambrosius von Przygodski, a Prussian officer-turned-gigolo. The film directed by David Hemmings is set between 1918 and the late 1920s, that explore the decadent period in Berlin during the rise of Nazism, a time of social upheaval and artistic experimentation. Marlene Dietrich appeared in her final onscreen role as the brothel proprietor. Although Bowie and Dietrich were interested in sharing scenes, their sequences were ultimately filmed separately.

The story and period setting reflected Bowie's fascination with post-World War I Berlin, paralleling the later Weimar-era themes famously depicted in the musical Cabaret. The Berlin premiere in 1978 was poorly received, leading to the suspension of international distribution and a subsequent re-edit in London.

== Production and recording ==
The soundtrack, supervised by Jack Fishman, featured a mix of period-style vocal and instrumental tracks with a contemporary 1970s sensibility. It included newly recorded songs by The Manhattan Transfer, Marlene Dietrich's rendition of the 1929 title track, and vintage standards performed by the Pasadena Roof Orchestra and The Ragtimers. Additional contributions included "Don't Let It Be Too Long", co-written by David Hemmings and Gunther Fischer and performed by Sydne Rome, arrangements by Frank Barber and John Altman, and primary recording at Olympic Studios in London.

One of the most notable contributions were Bowie's own composition "Revolutionary Song", co-credited to Fishman and performed by The Rebels. According to reports, Bowie composed the Kurt Weill-inspired tune between takes on set, providing his recognizable wordless vocals for multiple parts. Fishman remarked that the Manhattan Transfer recordings were likely the group's last before Laurel Massé's serious car accident in late 1978.

Marlene Dietrich agreed to perform the song "Just a Gigolo" in the film, although she despised it and called it "that terrible song", which she had disliked ever since it became popular in Berlin during her youth. Despite her aversion, she agreed to sing it, understanding its significance as the film's title and central statement. The recording was made with the accompaniment of her personal pianist, Raymond, in two takes in English and two in German, ensuring versions in both languages. In the scene, Dietrich walked to the piano without her cane and performed the song in a single long take, conveying an image of firmness and nostalgia. Her performance was described as majestic and emotive, moving the entire crew present, and was considered by many critics as self-referential, especially in the final line of the German version — "people pay, you keep on dancing" — interpreted as a reflection of her own artistic journey. The performance came to be seen as a symbolic conclusion of her film career, marking her last major appearance in cinema. Dietrich was reportedly moved to tears after receiving applause from technicians and fellow artists following the recording of her final track.

== Release details ==
The album was released by German record label Ariola in 1979. In February of the same year, the newly established Jambo Records had acquired the rights to the soundtrack, which would be distributed by Pye Records to coincide with the film's premiere. The LP was also distributed through Carrere in France, and Stig Anderson's Polar label in Sweden.

In 2019, Cherry Red Records reissued the album in a compact disc (CD) that was resequenced and expanded from the original LP issue. It includes a 24-page illustrated booklet with liner notes and track annotations, and was remastered by Paul Fishman. The album also contained tracks not featured in the film, such as Fischer's modern instrumental "Kissing Time" and a new "club mix" of Dietrich's "Just a Gigolo". In the same year, Dutch label Music On Vinyl released a 180g transparent blue vinyl, limited to 3,000 copies.

== Promotion ==
In addition to the LP release, singles were issued by other labels, including EMI for Dietrich's title track, Atlantic for a Manhattan Transfer song, and CBS for a Pasadena Roof Orchestra number. The film's UK release was supported by an extensive promotional campaign, including television and radio advertisements, print coverage, and merchandising such as a Corgi paperback. Jack Fishman, who supervised the soundtrack, led Jambo Records with assistance from his family and coordinated the album's promotion through radio and TV in the United Kingdom.

In 2019, Music On Vinyl released a 7-inch single (#MOV7053), titled Music From The Original Soundtrack Just A Gigolo by David Bowie & Marlene Dietrich including the songs "David Bowie's Revolutionary Song" by The Rebels (A-side), and "Just A Gigolo" by Marlene Dietrich as a B-side. It was released as a limited 7,500 copies on coloured vinyl.

== Critical reception ==
Professional ratings
Review scores
Source	Rating
Classic Pop	7/10

In a contemporary review, John Earls of Classic Pop magazine described the album as "one of the more intriguing recent one-off Bowie reissues".

Reviewing the Cherry Red Records' expanded edition for the website We Are Cult, the author James Gent described the soundtrack as "an enjoyable, intriguing, retro-nostalgic exercise in Weimar chic" and added that it is "worth the entrance price for the expansive sleeve notes alone".

== Commercial performance ==
On July 7, 1979, Record World reported that sales in the U.K. reached 50,000 copies.

== Track listing ==
Just a Gigolo – The Original Soundtrack
No.	Title	Writer(s)	Performer(s)	Length
1.	"Just a Gigolo"	Irving Caesar, Leonello Casucci	Marlene Dietrich	3:25
2.	"Salome"	Robert Stolz; uncredited Arthur Rebner	The Pasadena Roof Orchestra	3:41
3.	"Johnny"	Friedrich Hollaender, Jack Fishman	The Manhattan Transfer	3:31
4.	"The Streets of Berlin"	Günther Fischer	The Günther Fischer Orchestra	3:14
5.	"Charmaine"	Erno Rapee, Lou Pollack	The Pasadena Roof Orchestra	3:46
6.	"Don’t Let It Be Too Long"	David Hemmings, Günther Fischer	Sydne Rome	2:52
7.	"The Ragtime Dance"	Scott Joplin; arr. Alex Masters	The Ragtimers	3:08
8.	"Jealous Eyes"	Mihály Erdélyi, Jack Fishman	The Manhattan Transfer	2:53
9.	"David Bowie’s Revolutionary Song"	David Bowie, Jack Fishman	The Rebels (featuring David Bowie)	4:41
10.	"Easy Winners"	Scott Joplin; arr. Alex Masters	The Ragtimers	3:31
11.	"I Kiss Your Hand, Madame"	Ralph Erwin, Sam M. Lewis, Joe Young, Fritz Rotter	The Manhattan Transfer	3:10
12.	"Kissing Time"	Victor Herbert, A. K. Absalom, Günther Fischer	The Günther Fischer Quintet	3:31
13.	"Black Bottom"	Buddy DeSylva, Lew Brown, Ray Henderson	The Pasadena Roof Orchestra	3:00
14.	"Jealous Eyes"	Mihály Erdélyi, Jack Fishman	The Barnabas Orchestra	3:01
15.	"Just a Gigolo – I Ain’t Got Nobody"	Irving Caesar, Leonello Casucci, Roger Graham, Spencer Williams	Village People	4:13
Total length:				40:41

Just a Gigolo – The Original Soundtrack [Expanded CD edition (2019)]
No.	Title	Writer(s)	Performer(s)	Length
1.	"Just a Gigolo"	Irving Caesar, Leonello Casucci	Marlene Dietrich	3:34
2.	"Salome"	Robert Stolz; uncredited Arthur Rebner	The Pasadena Roof Orchestra	3:42
3.	"Revolutionary Song (Part 1)"	David Bowie, Jack Fishman	The Rebels (featuring David Bowie)	1:55
4.	"Johnny"	Friedrich Hollaender, Jack Fishman	The Manhattan Transfer	3:31
5.	"The Streets of Berlin"	Günther Fischer	The Günther Fischer Orchestra	3:27
6.	"Charmaine"	Erno Rapee, Lou Pollack	The Pasadena Roof Orchestra	3:51
7.	"Just a Gigolo (Instrumental – Piano)"	Irving Caesar, Leonello Casucci	Marlene Dietrich	0:34
8.	"Don’t Let It Be Too Long"	David Hemmings, Günther Fischer	Sydne Rome	3:03
9.	"Ragtime Dance"	Scott Joplin; arr. Alex Masters	The Ragtimers	3:14
10.	"Jealous Eyes"	Mihály Erdélyi, Jack Fishman	The Manhattan Transfer	2:53
11.	"Revolutionary Song (Part 2)"	David Bowie, Jack Fishman	The Rebels (featuring David Bowie)	1:32
12.	"I Kiss Your Hand, Madame"	Ralph Erwin, Sam M. Lewis, Joe Young, Fritz Rotter	The Manhattan Transfer	3:14
13.	"Just a Gigolo"	Irving Caesar, Leonello Casucci	Marlene Dietrich	1:34
14.	"Kissing Time"	Victor Herbert, A. K. Absalom, Günther Fischer	The Günther Fischer Quintet	3:36
15.	"Black Bottom"	Buddy DeSylva, Lew Brown, Ray Henderson	The Pasadena Roof Orchestra	3:00
16.	"Revolutionary Song (Part 3)"	David Bowie, Jack Fishman	The Rebels (featuring David Bowie)	0:49
17.	"Auf Wiedersehen Gigolo"	Irving Caesar, Leonello Casucci	Marlene Dietrich	2:26
18.	"Jealous Eyes"	Mihály Erdélyi, Jack Fishman	The Barnabas Orchestra	3:04
19.	"Easy Winners"	Scott Joplin; arr. Alex Masters	The Ragtimers	3:33
20.	"Revolutionary Song (Part 4 – Instrumental)"	David Bowie, Jack Fishman	The Rebels	0:53
21.	"Just a Gigolo – I Ain’t Got Nobody"	Irving Caesar, Leonello Casucci, Roger Graham, Spencer Williams	Village People	4:13
22.	"Just a Gigolo (Club Mix)"	Irving Caesar, Leonello Casucci	Marlene Dietrich	6:11
Total length:				64:36

== Personnel ==
Credits adapted from the liner notes of Just a Gigolo LP (Jambo Records, catalog no. JAM 1).

- Arranged By, Conductor – Frank Barber (tracks: A3, A7, A8, B2, B3), John Altman (tracks: A2, A5, B5)
- Engineer [Chief] – Keith Grant
- Executive Producer – Henri Belolo (tracks: B7)
- Illustration – United Kingdom Advertising
- Lacquer Cut By – Kev*
- Producer – Jacques Morali (tracks: B7), Tim Hauser (tracks: A3, A8, B3)
- Research [Research Consultant] – Joe Monte
- Supervised By [Album And Original Soundtrack Supervision] – Jack Fishman
- Vocals [Intro & Outro] – David Bowie (tracks: B1)
