= The Cosmopolitan Marlene Dietrich =

Compilation album by Marlene Dietrich
- Released: 1993
- Recorded: 1951–1954
- Genre: Traditional pop
- Label: Columbia/Legacy

Marlene Dietrich chronology
On Screen, Stage and Radio (1992)	The Cosmopolitan Marlene Dietrich (1993)	Mythos und Legende / Myth and Legend (1994)

The Cosmopolitan Marlene Dietrich is a compilation album by German-American actress and singer Marlene Dietrich, released in 1993 by Columbia/Legacy Records as part of the label’s "Art Deco" series. The project was conceived to highlight artists active between 1925 and 1941, aiming to preserve and reintroduce recordings from that period. Alongside Dietrich's collection, the initial series also included volumes devoted to female singers, male singers, songs about men, and a general overview of the Art Deco era.

The album contains eighteen tracks, combining original recordings made during World War II for the Office of Strategic Services with additional material from other sessions. Its repertoire features some of Dietrich's most recognized songs, as well as titles associated with her earlier album Marlene Dietrich Overseas. Several singles released after that record were also included in the compilation.

Upon release, the album was supported by a marketing campaign that targeted both traditional and alternative audiences. It received reviews from multiple publications, with critics noting the range of material and highlighting specific performances.

== Album details ==
Art Deco: The Cosmopolitan Marlene Dietrich was released as one of the five inaugural volumes of Columbia/Legacy's "Art Deco" series, dedicated to exploring the music of its namesake period (approximately 1925-1941). The collection was conceived to rescue and celebrate artists who, despite their influence, were underrepresented in record label catalogs. In addition to Dietrich's album, the series included the compilations Sophisticated Ladies (female singers), The Crooners (male singers), Can't Help Lovin' That Man (songs about men), and an overview titled This Is Art Deco, all released simultaneously. Each disc in the series was accompanied by an essay contextualizing the music within the artistic and technological movement of Art Deco, including the impact of the transition to electrical recording in 1925.

Comprising eighteen tracks, the work includes eight original recordings produced for the Office of Strategic Services (OSS) during World War II, supplemented by ten additional songs. The repertoire incorporates compositions such as "La Vie en Rose", "Falling in Love Again", and "Good for Nothin'", the latter originating from the Rosie and Marlene extended play (EP). Some sources identify it as a reissue of Dietrich's earlier 1951 album, Marlene Dietrich Overseas, with the addition of previously unreleased material.

The album includes singles' songs released shortly after Overseas. Regarding "Come Rain or Come Shine", Cash Box reviewed it as Marlene Dietrich's entry into the pop music field, noting her soft, moody vocal interpretation of the standard from the musical St. Louis Woman, accompanied by Jimmy Carroll's understated orchestral backing. The magazine assigned the single a grade of C, indicating a lukewarm reception and limited commercial expectations. The critic Claude Gilmour of Vancouver Sun, in his review dated August 18, 1952, commented on the release of the single and noted that, although the artist's voice was considered technically weak, her interpretation carried a distinct strength: the "coos and seductive whispers" she infused brought the songs to life. According to Gilmour, Dietrich's powerful "captivating and suggestive personality" was able to compensate for her vocal limitations, ensuring impact and authenticity in her performance.

== Promotion ==
Legacy's marketing strategy targeted a sophisticated audience, from traditional upscale publications and a younger, sophisticated consumer, including the alternative and gay markets. The label employed print advertising campaigns and promotion on syndicated big band radio programs to promote all volumes in an integrated manner.

== Critical reception ==
Professional ratings
Review scores
Source	Rating
AllMusic	4.5/5 stars
The Buffalo News	4/5 stars
The Encyclopedia of Popular Music	4/5 stars

AllMusic critic Stephen Thomas Erlewine described The Cosmopolitan Marlene Dietrich as "a terrific 18-track collection that showcases the seductive, sophisticated pop songs Dietrich recorded for Columbia Records", highlighting tracks such as "Lili Marlene", "Mean to Me", "Time on My Hands", "Taking a Chance on Love", "I Never Slept a Wink Last Night", "No Love, No Nothin'", and "Miss Otis Regrets".

Writing for The Buffalo News, critic Mary Kunz described 'The Cosmopolitan Marlene Dietrich as a collection of "eighteen shining recordings" from the 1930s to the 1950s. She noted that Dietrich was entertaining in her jazzy English numbers, particularly in a duet with Rosemary Clooney, but considered her at her best in more world-weary performances, such as "Lili Marlene" and "Falling in Love Again". Kunz remarked that the album was able to turn "even the most respectable North Buffalo living room into something out of a Kurt Weill cabaret.

In the Spartanburg Herald-Journal's music section on August 11, 1993, critic Jonathan Takiff featured the album, highlighting it as a "significant new compilation".

== Track listing ==
Art Decco: The Cosmopolitan Marlene Dietrich
No.	Title	Writer(s)	Length
1.	"Lili Marlene"	Hans Leip, Norbert Schultze	3:06
2.	"Mean To Me"	Fred E. Ahlert, Roy Turk	3:09
3.	"Annie Doesn't Live Here Anymore"	Johnny Burke, Harold Spina, Joe Young	2:57
4.	"The Surrey with the Fringe on Top"	Oscar Hammerstein II, Richard Rodgers	3:33
5.	"Time On My Hands"	Harold Adamson, Mack Gordon, Vincent Youmans	3:11
6.	"Taking a Chance On Love"	Vernon Duke, Ted Fetter, John Latouche	2:33
7.	"Miss Otis Regrets"	Cole Porter	3:44
8.	"I Never Slept a Wink Last Night"	Jimmy McHugh, Harold Adamson	2:38
9.	"Peter"	Friedrich Hollaender, Rudolf Nelson	3:50
10.	"Come Rain or Come Shine"	Harold Arlen, Johnny Mercer	2:58
11.	"A Guy What Takes His Time"	Ralph Rainger	2:44
12.	"Good for Nothing (duet with Rosemary Clooney)"	Alec Wilder, William Engvick	2:22
13.	"Falling in Love Again"	F. Hollander	2:23
14.	"La Vie en rose"	Edith Piaf, Louiguy, Mack David	2:49
15.	"No Love, No Nothin'"	Harry Warren, Leo Robin	2:52
16.	"Something I Dreamed Last Night"	Herb Magidson, Jack Yellen, Sammy Fain	3:30
17.	"Let's Call It a Day"	Lew Brown, Ray Henderson	3:10
18.	"Lili Marlene"	H. Leip, N. Schulze	3:05
Total length:			54:34

== Personnel ==
Credits adapted from the liner notes of The Cosmopolitan Marlene Dietrich CD (catalog no. CK 53209).

- Art Direction – Mark Burdett
- Compilation Producer – Michael Brooks
- Packaging Coordination – Gina Campanaro
- Design – Julian Peploe
- Directed by Jimmy Carroll
- Computer Graphics – Timothy Manteau*
- Liner Notes – Michael Brooks, Will Friedwald
- Photography by Culver Pictures
- Original Recordings Produced by Mitch Miller
- Project Director – Adam Block
- Digitally Remastered by Larry Keyes

== See also ==
- Marlene Dietrich discography
