= You Do Something to Me (Cole Porter song) =

1929 song written by Cole Porter

Song by Genevieve Tobin and William Gaxton

from the album Fifty Million Frenchmen
- Released: 1929
- Genre: Show tune
- Songwriter: Cole Porter

"You Do Something to Me" was the first number in Cole Porter's first fully integrated-book musical Fifty Million Frenchmen (1929). In the original production, the song was performed by Genevieve Tobin and William Gaxton, performing the roles of Looloo Carroll and Peter Forbes, respectively.

== Background ==
There are two verses and two choruses. The song has been described as "a tender prequel" to "Let's Do It, Let's Fall in Love," Porter's first popular song.

== Recorded versions ==
The song has been recorded by artists including:

- The Clicquot Club Eskimos directed by Harry Reser (1929)
- Lena Horne on It's Love (1955)
- Perry Como on So Smooth (1955)
- Bing Crosby recorded the song in 1955 for his radio show. It was subsequently included in The Bing Crosby CBS Radio Recordings (1954-56) (Mosaic Records MD7-245, 2009).
- Frank Sinatra on Sinatra’s Swingin’ Session!!! (1961)
- Ella Fitzgerald, on Ella Fitzgerald Sings the Cole Porter Songbook (1956) and Ella à Nice (recorded 1971, released 1982)
- Sinéad O'Connor on Red Hot + Blue (1990)
- Bryan Ferry on As Time Goes By (1999)
- Doris Day
- Johnny Mathis
- Marlene Dietrich

== Popular culture ==
- The phrase "do that voodoo that you do so well" is quoted by Hedley Lamarr (Harvey Korman) in the 1974 film Blazing Saddles as he exhorts his gang to attack a frontier town.
- Bette Midler's version of the song plays over the final credits of the 1991 film Scenes from a Mall, which starred her and Woody Allen.
- A variant of the "voodoo" phrase is also quoted in the 1993 Salt-N-Pepa song "Shoop".
- A 2011 Paul Krugman editorial in The New York Times was headlined "Do Do that Voodoo". It was about trickle-down economics.
