= The Boys in the Back Room (song) =

- US 78-rpm single cover

Single by Marlene Dietrich
- B-side: "Falling in Love Again"
- Released: 1939
- Genre: Traditional pop
- Label: Decca
- Songwriters: Friedrich Hollaender, Frank Loesser

Marlene Dietrich singles chronology
"Wo Ist Der Mann?" (1935)	"The Boys in the Back Room" (1939)	"Lili Marlene" (1945)

"The Boys in the Back Room" is a song written by Frank Loesser, set to music by Frederick Hollaender and performed by Marlene Dietrich in the film Destry Rides Again (1939). It is often referred to as "See What the Boys in the Back Room Will Have". Her winking performance was a parody of her vampish roles in earlier films such as The Blue Angel (1930) and Blonde Venus (1932). The song became a standard part of her repertoire, second only to "Lili Marlene". She also sang a German version called "Gib doch den Männern am Stammtisch ihr Gift".

== Film and TV appearances ==
In addition to Destry Rides Again, the song has been featured in several other movies and TV shows.

- Featured in the Audie Murphy Western Gunsmoke (1953), sung in the town saloon by Cora Dufrayne, played by Mary Castle.

- In Rainer Werner Fassbinder's film World on a Wire (1973), Ingrid Caven performs the song.

- It is often sung by Lieutenant Gruber in 'Allo 'Allo!.

- Parodied on a Christmas episode of the comedy show The Two Ronnies.

- Sung by Monique Duchamps (played by Angela Richards) in 1979 in the series Secret Army, episode "Ring of Rosies".

- Performed by Alexis Colby (played by Joan Collins) in an episode of Dynasty in 1984.

- Also featured in Call of Duty WW2, on the mission Operation Cobra. If you listen to the radio at the beginning, you will hear this song play.

== Additional recorded versions ==
Among other recorded versions:

- Patricia Prawit in her album Allein in einer grossen Stadt - Ein Abend für Marlene (2005)
- Arielle Dombasle in her album C'est si Bon (2006) and her EP Iconics (2024)
