= Seven Sinners (1940 film) =

1940 film

- Film poster
- Directed by: Tay Garnett
- Written by: John Meehan; Harry Tugend
- Based on: story by Ladislas Fodor; László Vadnay
- Produced by: Joe Pasternak
- Starring: Marlene Dietrich; John Wayne; Albert Dekker; Broderick Crawford; Mischa Auer; Billy Gilbert; Anna Lee; Samuel S. Hinds; Oskar Homolka
- Cinematography: Rudolph Maté
- Edited by: Ted J. Kent
- Music by: Hans J. Salter; Frank Skinner
- Production company: Joe Pasternak Productions
- Distributed by: Universal Pictures
- Release date: October 25, 1940
- Running time: 87 minutes
- Country: United States
- Language: English
- Budget: $739,000

Seven Sinners (UK title Cafe of the Seven Sinners) is a 1940 American drama romance film directed by Tay Garnett starring Marlene Dietrich and John Wayne in the first of three films they made together. The film was produced by Universal Pictures in black and white.

== Plot ==
Torch singer Bijou Blanche has been kicked off one South Seas island after another. She is accompanied by naval deserter Edward Patrick 'Little Ned' Finnegan and magician/pickpocket Sasha Mencken. Eventually, she meets a handsome young naval officer, Lt. Dan Brent, and the two fall in love. When Brent vows to marry Bijou, his commander and others plead with him to leave her.

== Cast ==
- Marlene Dietrich as Bijou Blanche
- John Wayne as Lt. Dan Brent
- Albert Dekker as Dr. Martin
- Broderick Crawford as Edward Patrick 'Little Ned' Finnegan
- Anna Lee as Dorothy Henderson
- Mischa Auer as Sasha Mencken
- Billy Gilbert as Tony
- Richard Carle as District Officer
- Samuel S. Hinds as Gov. Harvey Henderson
- Oskar Homolka as Antro
- Reginald Denny as Capt. Church
- Vince Barnett as Bartender
- Herbert Rawlinson as First Mate
- James Craig as Ensign
- William Bakewell as Ens. Judson

== Production ==
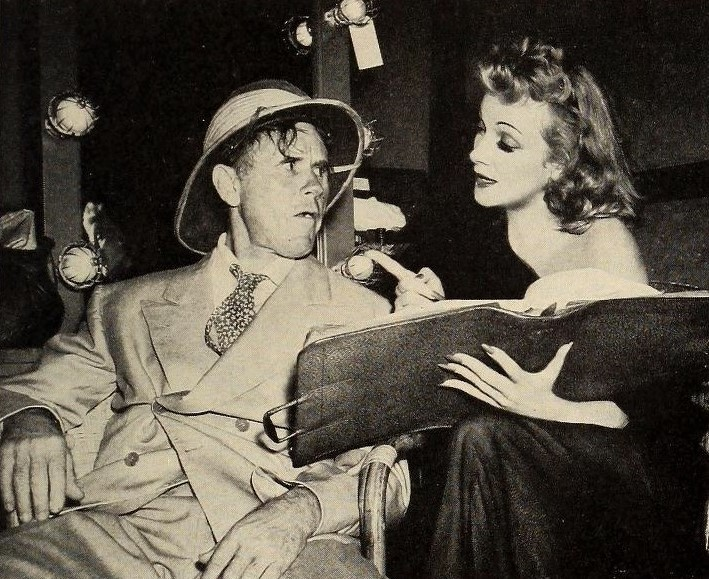
Tay Garnett and Marlene Dietrich on the set

Dietrich had just revived her career with Destry Rides Again (1939) and this film featured many of the same elements, including cast members Mischa Auer, Billy Gilbert and Samuel S. Hinds. She was paid $150,000 for her performance.

The film was the second American film for Anna Lee (although the first to be released). She says Marlene Dietrich insisted Lee dye her hair from blonde to brown so she would not clash with Dietrich. She also says Dietrich selected John Wayne as her leading man after spotting him in the commissary and saying to producer Joe Pasternak, "Mommy wants that for Christmas."

Filming took place from July to September 14, 1940. In 1950, the film was remade as South Sea Sinner, starring Macdonald Carey and Shelley Winters.

== See also ==
- Marlene Dietrich filmography
- Randolph Scott filmography
- John Wayne filmography
- The Spoilers (1942 film), with Marlene Dietrich, Randolph Scott, and John Wayne
- Pittsburgh (1942 film), with Marlene Dietrich, Randolph Scott, and John Wayne
