= Pittsburgh (1942 film) =

1942 film by Lewis Seiler

- Theatrical release poster
- Directed by: Lewis Seiler
- Screenplay by: Kenneth Gamet; Tom Reed
- Story by: George Owen; Tom Reed
- Produced by: Charles K. Feldman; Robert Fellows
- Starring: Marlene Dietrich; Randolph Scott; John Wayne; Frank Craven; Louise Allbritton; Shemp Howard; Thomas Gomez; Ludwig Stössel; Samuel S. Hinds
- Cinematography: Robert De Grasse
- Edited by: Paul Landres
- Music by: Hans J. Salter; Frank Skinner
- Production company: Charles K. Feldman Group
- Distributed by: Universal Pictures
- Release date: December 11, 1942 (United States)
- Running time: 91 minutes
- Country: United States
- Language: English
- Box office: $1.1 million (US rentals)

Pittsburgh is a 1942 American drama film directed by Lewis Seiler and starring Marlene Dietrich, Randolph Scott, and John Wayne. Based on a story by George Owen and Tom Reed, the film is about an ambitious coal miner who values wealth and power in the Pittsburgh steel industry over his friends, lovers, and ideals, only to find himself deserted and alone at the top. When his fortune crumbles around him, he discovers that fate offers him an unexpected second chance. Filmed partially on location in Pittsburgh, Pennsylvania, the film co-stars Shemp Howard of Three Stooges fame in a rare dramatic role. Dietrich, Scott, and Wayne also made The Spoilers together that same year. Scott received top billing over Wayne in both films despite the fact that Wayne's roles were larger and more important.

== Plot ==
Pittsburgh Markham is a coal miner with ambitions. His self-confidence manifests itself in a lack of consideration for others. He's usually friendly but he makes use of people; to promote a loan, to con a new suit out of a tailor, to raise some money from a boxing match by pushing his best friend Cash Evans into the ring. When he meets Josie Winters, he starts calling her "Countess" because of the impression she makes on him, although she reveals that she comes from the same kind of humble coal-mining background as himself. Josie remains somewhat unimpressed by his big ideas, but when she dares him to quit his job in the mine, he does so—and tenders Cash's resignation as well.

He interests a steel mill owner in a supply of cut-price coke, and forges the steel mill owner's signature on a contract to persuade the mine owner to supply it. Flush with success, he starts talking of helping to improve the lot of the men he used to work with, but his first taste of big business goes to his head. He marries the steel mill owner's daughter, much to Josie's dismay, but soon feels out of his depth at the wedding reception and other formal gatherings.

As Pittsburgh follows his lonely path to further heights of financial wizardry and big business success, his old ideals fall by the wayside. He puts his father-in-law out of the business and he betrays the men that he had promised to help. He even puts a stop to research into a new medicine to be developed from coal tar to relieve world suffering because it doesn't show any profit. Cash draws the line and demands to be let out of his partnership with Pittsburgh. When the men stage a revolt against Pittsburgh in the mine, he goes down to tackle them singlehanded, as bold and confident as ever, and Cash follows to intercede before trouble can break out, putting the dispute on a personal level between him and Pittsburgh and turning it into a fistfight.

Pittsburgh's success goes sour, Cash abandons him, his wife walks out, and Josie is badly hurt in a mine accident. He is all alone. He tries to win friends by putting right his past mistakes. Cash and Josie marry and Pittsburgh's business folds up under him. Only now does he feel genuinely repentant, but it is too late. As World War II engages America, he goes to work for Cash's new company under an assumed name, starting at the bottom. Soon his ideas for improving output command Cash's attention and when the new employee comes to meet the boss only Josie prevents them from quarreling bitterly, giving the film a patriotic message that the important thing at this time of war is "devotion to our country." With the three united as friends again, it remains for Pittsburgh to make one small assertion of his old arrogance. Given the job of production manager by Cash, he upgrades himself to being his partner.

== Cast ==
- Marlene Dietrich as Josie "Hunky" Winters
- Randolph Scott as John "Cash" Evans
- John Wayne as Charles "Pittsburgh" Markham/Charles Ellis
- Frank Craven as J.M. "Doc" Powers
- Louise Allbritton as Shannon Prentiss (Markham)
- Shemp Howard as Shorty (the tailor)
- Thomas Gomez as Joe Malneck (the miners' union president)
- Ludwig Stössel as Dr. Grazlich (Doc Powers' partner)
- Samuel S. Hinds as Morgan Prestiss (president of Prentiss Steel)
- Paul Fix as Burnside (the mine operator)
- William Haade as Johnny (the miner)
- Charles Coleman as Mike (Markham's Butler)
- Nestor Paiva as Barney, Cafe Proprietor
- Ray Walker as Sutcliffe
- Grace Cunard (uncredited)
- Sammy Stein as Killer Kane, Prizefighter (uncredited)
- Hobart Cavanaugh as Derelict (uncredited)
- Joe Kirk as Nightclub Patron (uncredited)

== Reception ==
Although successful at the box office, Pittsburgh did not receive positive reviews from critics. The film critic for The New York Times called the film "another lusty and totally synthetic film" and "routine entertainment at best".

In his review on Eye for Film, Caro Ness wrote that the film was "like a Western taken out of context, replacing the cowboys and Indians with coal miners and steel impresarios." Ness criticized the heavy-handed message, writing:

This is an unashamed propaganda film to inspire workers to work harder in order to help the War effort. The story is predictable and dated and it is hard to ignore the message that is driven home: that the greater good (i.e. the war effort) is more important than individual wealth and petty entanglements.

== See also ==
- Marlene Dietrich filmography
- Randolph Scott filmography
- John Wayne filmography
- Seven Sinners (1940 film), with Marlene Dietrich and John Wayne
- The Spoilers (1942 film), with Marlene Dietrich, Randolph Scott, and John Wayne
