= I Wish You Love =

I Wish You Love may refer to:

- "I Wish You Love" (song), an English relyricization of the French popular song "Que reste-t-il de nos amours ?"
- I Wish You Love, original title of, and featured song in, 1972 TV special An Evening with Marlene Dietrich
- I Wish You Love (Gloria Gaynor album), 2003
- I Wish You Love, a 1964 album and two singles by Gloria Lynne
- I Wish You Love, a 2002 album by Janis Siegel
- I Wish You Love (Keely Smith album), 1957, and its title song
