= Marlene Dietrich filmography =

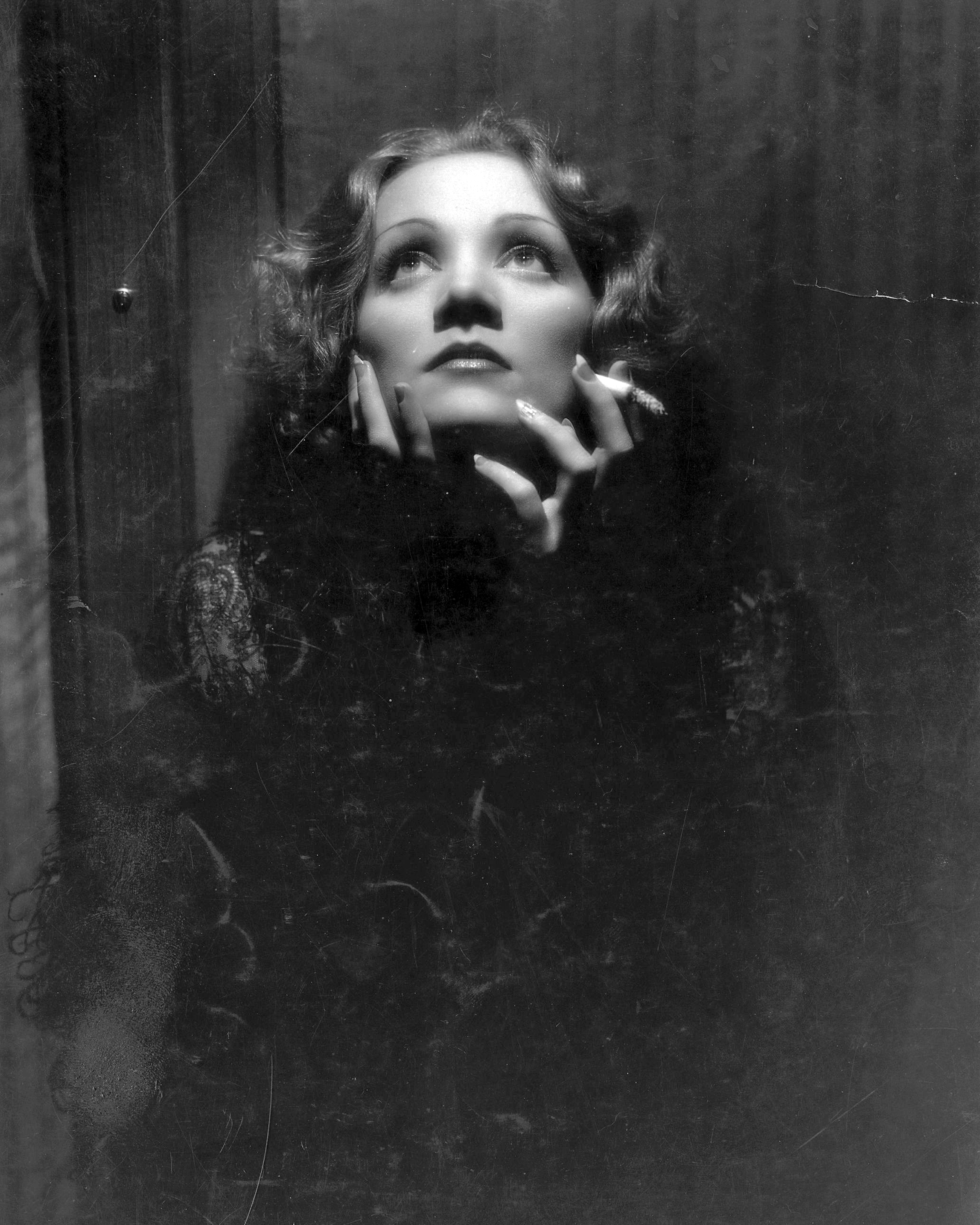
A still from Shanghai Express (1932). Josef von Sternberg used butterfly lighting to enhance Dietrich's features.

The film career of actress Marlene Dietrich started with silent films, as she made her film debut with The Little Napoleon (1923). She was propelled to international fame by director Josef von Sternberg, who cast her as Lola-Lola in The Blue Angel (1930). The film's commercial success brought her a contract with Paramount Pictures in the United States.

Paramount sought to market Dietrich as a German answer to Metro-Goldwyn-Mayer's Swedish actress Greta Garbo. Her first American film, Morocco (1930), directed by Sternberg, earned Dietrich her only Academy Award nomination. She would appear in several other films directed by Sternberg, including Dishonored (1931), Blonde Venus (1932) and Shanghai Express (1932).

Dietrich and Sternberg's last two film collaborations, The Scarlet Empress (1934) and The Devil Is a Woman (1935)—the most styled of their collaborations—were their least successful at the box office. Her first sound film without Sternberg was 1933's The Song of Songs, directed by Rouben Mamoulian, although she and Sternberg would later work together another two times.

Without Sternberg, Dietrich—along with Joan Crawford, Mae West, Greta Garbo, Katharine Hepburn and others—was labeled "box office poison" after the film Knight Without Armour (1937) proved a box office failure. In 1939, however, her stardom was revived when she played a cowboy saloon girl in the Western comedy Destry Rides Again opposite James Stewart, singing "See What the Boys in the Back Room Will Have".

While Dietrich arguably never fully regained her former screen glory, she continued performing in films, including appearances for such distinguished directors as Billy Wilder, Alfred Hitchcock and Orson Welles, in successful films that included A Foreign Affair (1948), Stage Fright (1950), Witness for the Prosecution (1957), Touch of Evil (1958) and Judgment at Nuremberg (1961). Her final film appearance was as herself in the 1984 documentary Marlene.

In 1999, the American Film Institute named Dietrich as the ninth-greatest female star of classic Hollywood cinema.

== Film ==
=== Silent feature films ===
Year	Title	Role	Notes	Ref.
1919	Im Schatten des Glücks	Unknown	Unconfirmed role	
1923	The Little Napoleon	Kathrin, a housemaid		
1923	Tragedy of Love	Lucy		
1923	Man by the Wayside	Kramerstochter		
1924	The Monk from Santarem	Unknown		
1924	Leap Into Life	Mädchen am Strand		
1925	Dancing Mad	Dance extra		
1926	Manon Lescaut	Micheline		
1926	Madame Wants No Children	Dancer	Uncredited	
1927	A Modern Dubarry	Kokotte		
1927	The Imaginary Baron	Sophie		
1927	Heads Up, Charley	Edmee Marchand		
1927	His Greatest Bluff	Yvette		
1927	Café Elektric	Erni		
1928	Princess Olala	Chichotte de Gastone		
1929	Dangers of the Engagement Period	Evelyne		
1929	I Kiss Your Hand, Madame	Laurence Gerard (Lucille in the US)		
1929	The Woman One Longs For	Stascha		
1929	The Ship of Lost Souls	Ethel Marley		

=== Sound feature films ===
Year	Title	Role	Notes
1930	The Blue Angel	Lola-Lola	Separate German and English versions were shot simultaneously.
1930	Morocco	Mademoiselle Amy Jolly	
1931	Dishonored	Marie Kolverer	
1932	Shanghai Express	Shanghai Lily	
1932	Blonde Venus	Helen Faraday	
1933	The Song of Songs	Lily Czepanek	
1934	The Scarlet Empress	Princess Sophia Frederica / Catherine II	
1935	The Devil Is a Woman	Concha Perez	
1936	I Loved a Soldier	Anna Sedlak	Unfinished film
1936	Desire	Madeleine de Aupre	
1936	The Garden of Allah	Domini Enfilden	Her first Technicolor film
1937	Knight Without Armour	Countess Alexandra Vladinoff	
1937	Angel	Maria Berker	
1939	Destry Rides Again	Frenchy	
1940	Seven Sinners	Bijou Blanche	
1941	The Flame of New Orleans	Countess Claire Ledoux	
1941	Manpower	Fay Duvall	
1942	The Lady Is Willing	Elizabeth Madden	
1942	The Spoilers	Cherry Malotte	
1942	Pittsburgh	Josey "Hunky" Winters	
1944	Kismet	Jamilla	
1944	Follow the Boys	Herself	
1946	Martin Roumagnac	Blanche Ferrand	
1947	Golden Earrings	Lydia	
1948	A Foreign Affair	Erika von Schlütow	
1949	Jigsaw	Herself	Uncredited cameo
1950	Stage Fright	Charlotte Inwood	
1951	No Highway in the Sky	Monica Teasdale	
1952	Rancho Notorious	Altar Keane	
1956	Around the World in 80 Days	Saloon hostess	Cameo
1956	The Monte Carlo Story	Maria de Creveçoeur	
1957	Witness for the Prosecution	Christine Vole (Helm) / Cockney woman	
1958	Touch of Evil	Tanya	
1961	Judgment at Nuremberg	Frau Bertholt	
1962	Black Fox: The Rise and Fall of Adolf Hitler	Narrator	Voice
1964	Paris When It Sizzles	Herself	Uncredited cameo
1978	Just a Gigolo	Baroness von Semering	
1984	Marlene	Herself	Voice

=== Short films ===
Year	Title	Notes
1928	Die gluckliche Mutter	Dietrich biographer Steven Bach notes that the release of this film has not been verified.
1935	The Fashion Side of Hollywood	Promotional short film publicizing costumes designed by Travis Banton.
1937	Screen Snapshots Series 16, No. 7	
1943	Show Business at War	
1944	Memo for Joe	

== Television ==
Complete list of television appearances (excluding news footage):

- Unicef Gala (Düsseldorf, 1962): Guest Appearance
- Cirque d'hiver (Paris, 9 March 1963): Cameo as "Garcon de Piste"
- Deutsche-Schlager-Festspiele (Baden-Baden, 1963): Guest Appearance
- Grand Gala du Disque (Edison Awards) (The Hague, 1963): Guest Appearance
- Galakväll pa Berns (Stockholm, 1963): Concert, with introduction by Karl Gerhardt and orchestra conducted by Burt Bacharach
- Royal Variety Performance (London, 4 November 1963): Guest Appearance
- The Stars Shine for Jack Hylton (London, 1965): Guest Appearance
- The Magic of Marlene (Melbourne, October 1965): Concert, with orchestra conducted by William Blezard.
- The 22nd Annual Tony Awards (New York, 21 April 1968): Acceptance Speech
- Guest Star Marlene Dietrich (Copenhagen – for Swedish Television, 1970): Interview
- I Wish You Love (An Evening with Marlene Dietrich) (London, 23 & 24 November 1972): Concert TV Special, with orchestra conducted by Stan Freeman.
