= Sharp Shooters =

1928 film

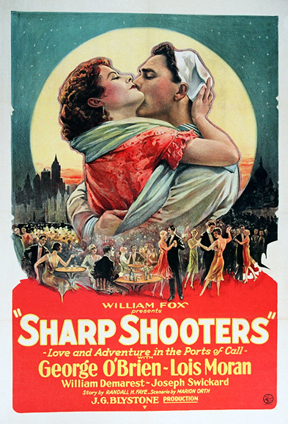
- Theatrical release poster
- Directed by: John G. Blystone
- Written by: Malcolm Stuart Boylan; Marion Orth
- Story by: Randall Faye
- Produced by: William Fox
- Starring: George O'Brien; Lois Moran; Noah Young
- Cinematography: Charles G. Clarke
- Edited by: J. Logan Pearson
- Production company: Fox Film Corporation
- Distributed by: Fox Film Corporation
- Release date: January 15, 1928 (USA)
- Running time: 60 minutes
- Country: United States
- Language: English intertitles

Sharp Shooters is a 1928 American silent comedy film directed by John G. Blystone and starring George O'Brien, Lois Moran, and Noah Young. A print survives in the UCLA Film & Television Archive. Sharp Shooters contains uncredited performances by Boris Karloff and Randolph Scott in his first film appearance.

== Plot ==
George is a sailor and smooth-talking lady's man who believes in the adage "love 'em and leave 'em" when it comes to women. While on leave in Morocco, George meets Lorette, a fiery French dancing girl who falls madly in love with him, unaware that he has a girl in every port. Initially thinking of her as just another diversion, George soon discovers that he can't get rid of the girl. She follows him to the United States; he does his best to avoid her. Amused by George's predicament and feeling sorry for the girl, his two best friends, Tom and Jerry shanghai him aboard a vessel and arrange things so that George is unable to avoid Lorette. As a result, George surrenders to the inevitable and marries her.

== Cast ==
- George O'Brien as George
- Lois Moran as Lorette
- Noah Young as Tom
- Tom Dugan as Jerry
- William Demarest as "Hi Jack" Murdock
- Gwen Lee as Flossy
- Josef Swickard as Grandpère
- Richard Cramer as Cafe Mug (uncredited)
- Boris Karloff as Cafe Proprietor (uncredited)
- Randolph Scott as Foreign Serviceman in Moroccan Cafe (uncredited)
- Harry Tenbrook as Hood (uncredited)

== See also ==
- Boris Karloff filmography
- Randolph Scott filmography
