= 7th Cavalry (film) =

1956 film

- Theatrical release poster
- Directed by: Joseph H. Lewis
- Screenplay by: Peter Packer
- Based on: A Horse For Mrs. Custer; 1954 short story in New World Writing by Glendon Swarthout
- Produced by: Harry Joe Brown; Randolph Scott
- Starring: Randolph Scott; Barbara Hale; Jay C. Flippen
- Cinematography: Ray Rennahan
- Edited by: Gene Havlick
- Production company: Columbia Pictures
- Distributed by: Columbia Pictures
- Release date: December 1956
- Running time: 76 minutes
- Country: United States
- Language: English

7th Cavalry is a 1956 American Western film directed by Joseph H. Lewis and starring Randolph Scott and Barbara Hale. The script is based on the story "A Horse for Mrs. Custer" by Glendon Swarthout. The film is set after the Battle of the Little Bighorn and was filmed in Mexico.

== Plot ==
Captain Tom Benson brings his fiancée Martha to Fort Abraham Lincoln where his regiment, the 7th Cavalry is stationed. Benson is mystified to find the fort deserted. He is met by the hysterical Charlotte Reynolds, whose husband replaced Benson as commander of his "C" Company and was killed at the Battle of the Little Bighorn. Only a small group of misfits and guardhouse prisoners led by an old sergeant remain.

When the commands of Major Marcus Reno and Captain Frederick Benteen return, they and the widows hold Benson in contempt. Martha's father Colonel Kellogg comes to the post to convene a board of inquiry into George Custer's actions that Benson sees as a smear against a man whom he admired.

When the president of the United States orders the recovery of the slain officers and the burial of the cavalrymen who fell in the battle, Benson takes his misfits and military prisoners into Indian territory to perform the task. Benson faces several mutiny attempts, mostly led by Vogel. After Benson beats Vogel in a fistfight, Sgt. Bates is forced to kill Vogel's henchman when he tries to kill Benson in his sleep.

The Indians have made the land sacred ground and do not want the enemies whom they respected taken from their burial site. A standoff develops as the cavalry insist on leaving the battleground with the dead officers' bodies. As the situation becomes tense, Vogel is shot dead with an arrow while trying to escape. Custer's second horse appears and is mistaken for Custer's dead horse by the Indians. The bugler blows the call to charge and the horse gallops toward the cavalry's position. The Indians believe that Custer's spirit has returned and allow the cavalry to leave the field.

Back at the camp, Captain Benson is reconciled with his father–in–law and salutes as a 35–star American flag is lowered.

== Cast ==
- Randolph Scott as Capt. Tom Benson
- Barbara Hale as Martha Kellogg
- Jay C. Flippen as Sgt. Bates
- Frank Faylen as Sgt. Kruger
- Jeanette Nolan as Charlotte Reynolds
- Leo Gordon as Vogel
- Denver Pyle as Dixon
- Harry Carey Jr. as Cpl. Morrison
- Michael Pate as Capt. Benteen
- Donald Curtis as Lt. Bob Fitch
- Frank Wilcox as Maj. Reno
- Pat Hogan as Young Hawk
- Russell Hicks as Col. Kellogg
- Peter Ortiz as Pollock
- Charles Horvath as Indian

== See also ==
- Randolph Scott filmography

== Bibliography ==
- Evans, Alun. Brassey's Guide to War Films. Brassey's, 2000. ISBN 1-57488-263-5 p. 180.
