= Rote Insel =

Neighborhood in the Schöneberg district of Berlin, Germany

Coordinates: 52°29′02″N 13°21′44″E

Situation of the "Rote Insel" inside the district of Berlin-Schöneberg

Rote Insel (literally, Red Island) is the name colloquially given to a neighborhood in the Schöneberg district of the German capital, Berlin. As such, the neighborhood is part of Berlin's 7th administrative borough, Tempelhof-Schöneberg.

== Overview ==
On the Berlin city map, the neighborhood is located within a distinctive triangle bordered by railway lines in the southwestern corner of the city center. The large trenches dug to accommodate the tracks for trains and light-rail make crossing one of the many bridges that span the tracks, and that form the area into an "island", the only ways to access this part of Schöneberg. Its comparative isolation from the adjoining parts of Berlin is why the area is considered insular. Its peculiar history is indicative of the sharp contrasts with which modern German history since 1871 abounds. Up until the end of World War I, roughly half of the Island's territory was marked by its extensive use by the Prussian army, whereas the other half was a distinctively working-class residential district, dominated by voters of left-wing parties (hence the "red").

As the Island survived the allied air raids during World War II virtually intact, it has managed to maintain much of its distinctive flavor. The neighborhood is populated by residents from varied ethnic backgrounds, with an unobtrusive Bohème charm, but lacking the mannerisms typical of the "hipper" quarters of post-reunification Berlin.

The best known person from the neighborhood is Marlene Dietrich, who was born in Leberstrasse 65 (then called Sedanstrasse) on December 27, 1901. The actress and singer Hildegard Knef, lived in the same street where Dietrich was born, in Leberstrasse 33. Both women are very much a part of the local folklore of the island. Alfred Lion, the co-founder of the American Blue Note jazz record label, was also born in the neighborhood.

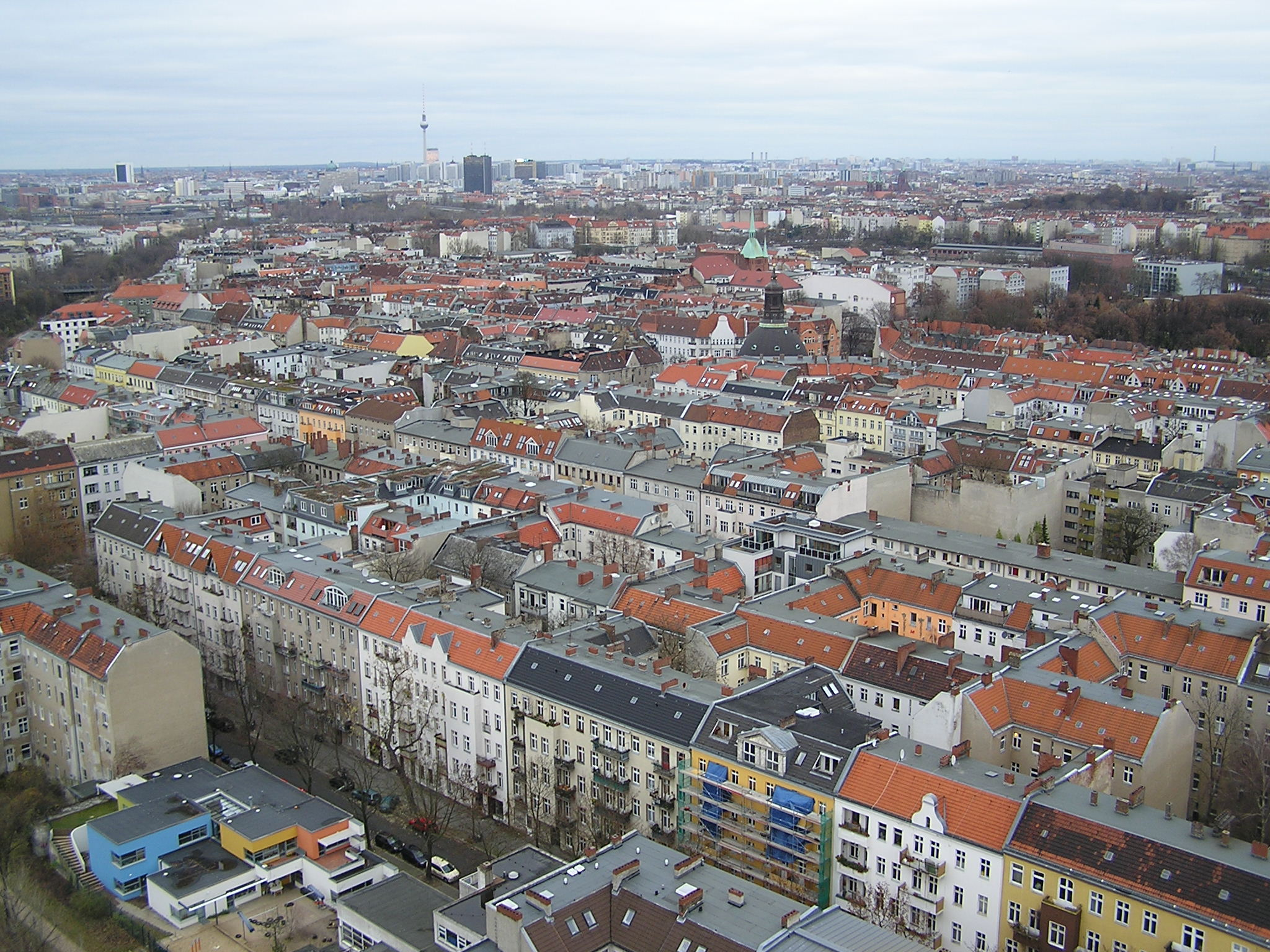
View over Rote Insel

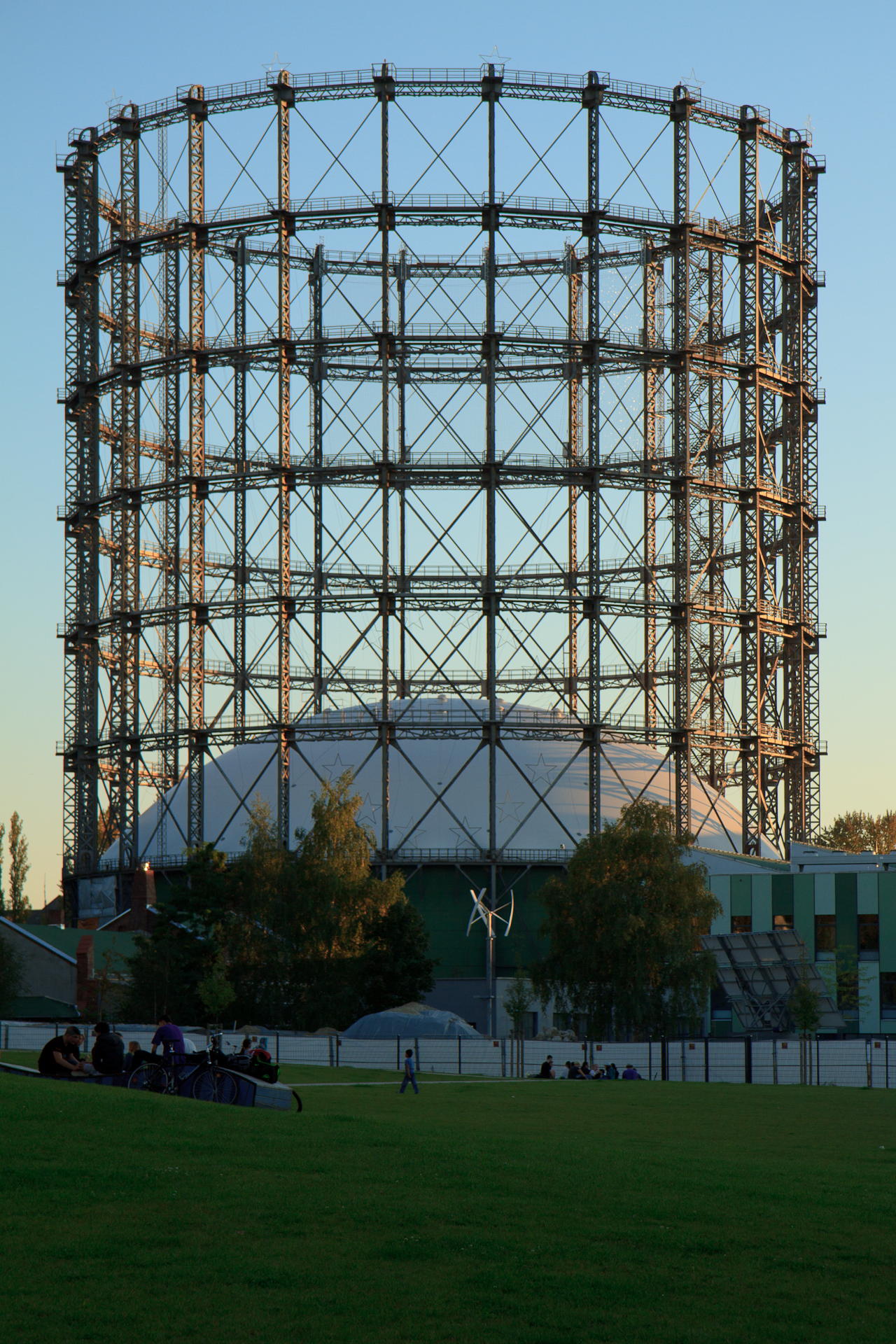
Landmark and industrial monument: a gasometer

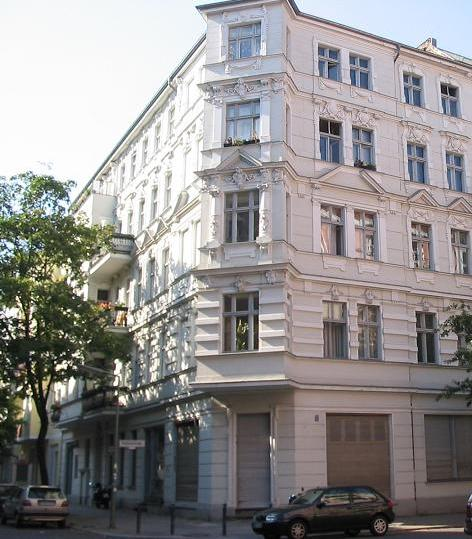
Birthplace of Alfred Lion

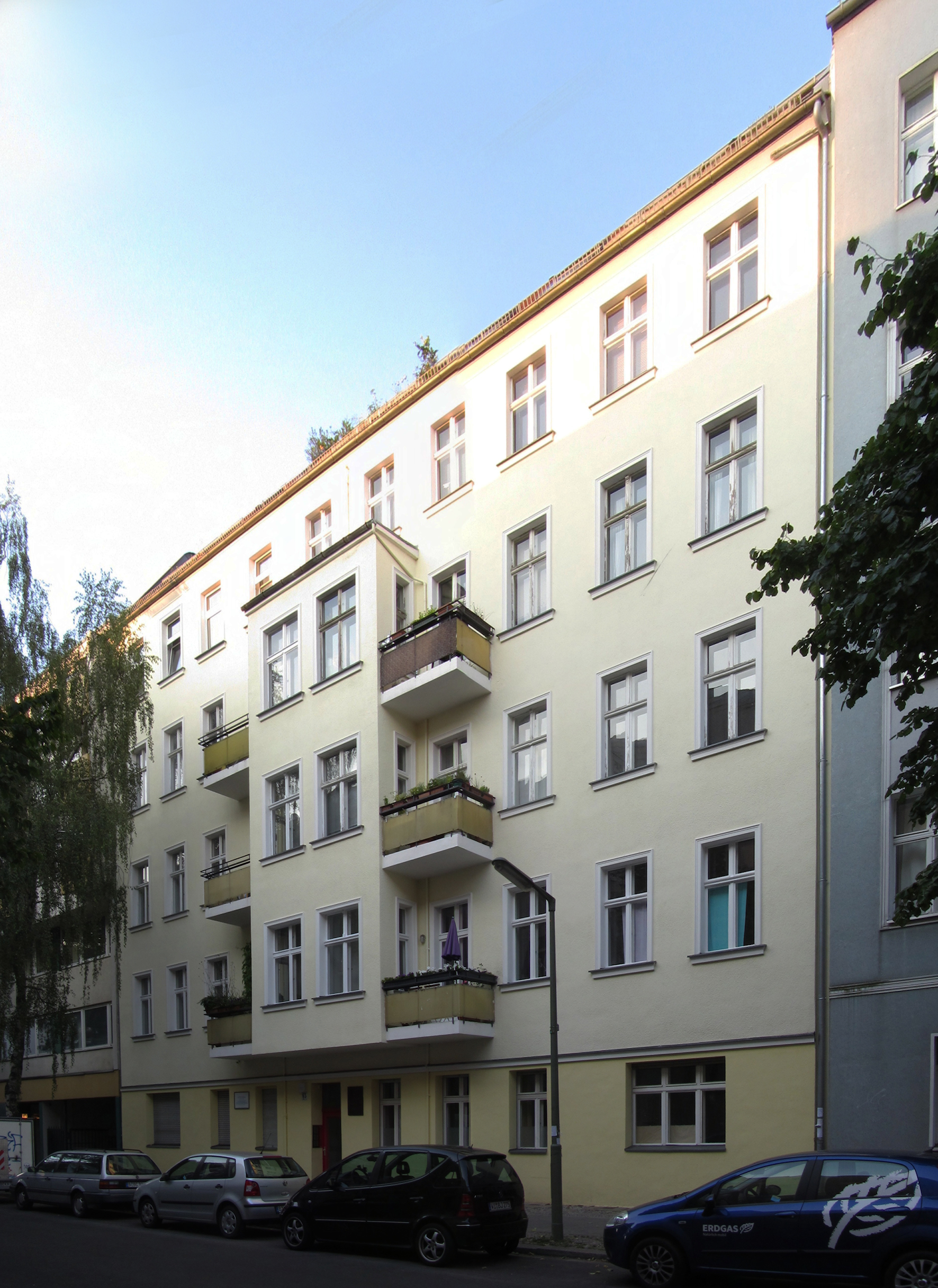
Birthplace of Marlene Dietrich

Extension of the "Cherusker Park" at the south end of Rote Insel.
