= Edward Ray Robinson =

American set decorator

- Born: July 24, 1893; Los Angeles, California
- Died: April 27, 1979 (aged 85); Los Angeles, California
- Occupation: Set decorator
- Years active: 1942-1952

Edward Ray Robinson (July 24, 1893 – April 27, 1979) was an American set decorator. He was nominated in 1942 for an Academy Award in the category Best Art Direction for the film The Spoilers.

== Selected filmography ==
- The Spoilers (1942)
- Son of Dracula (1943)
- Patrick the Great (1945)
- Swell Guy (1946)
- The Lovable Cheat (1949)
- Kansas City Confidential (1952)
