= The Spoilers (1942 film) =

1942 film by Ray Enright

- Theatrical release poster
- Directed by: Ray Enright
- Screenplay by: Lawrence Hazard; Tom Reed
- Based on: The Spoilers; 1906 novel by Rex Beach
- Produced by: Frank Lloyd; Lee Marcus
- Starring: Marlene Dietrich; Randolph Scott; John Wayne; Margaret Lindsay; Harry Carey; Richard Barthelmess
- Cinematography: Milton R. Krasner
- Edited by: Clarence Kolster
- Music by: Hans J. Salter
- Color process: Black and white
- Production companies: Frank Lloyd Productions; Charles K. Feldman Group
- Distributed by: Universal Pictures
- Release date: June 11, 1942
- Running time: 87 minutes
- Country: United States
- Language: English
- Box office: $1.1 million (US rentals)

The Spoilers is a 1942 American Western film directed by Ray Enright and starring Marlene Dietrich, Randolph Scott and John Wayne.

The Spoilers was adapted to screen by Lawrence Hazard from the 1906 Rex Beach novel of the same name. Film versions also appeared in 1914, in 1923 (with Noah Beery Sr. as McNamara and Anna Q. Nilsson as Malotte), in 1930 (with Gary Cooper as Glennister and Betty Compson as Malotte; this is the only time that Gary Cooper and John Wayne played the same role in different films), and in 1955 (with Anne Baxter as Malotte, Jeff Chandler as Glennister and Rory Calhoun as McNamara).

Marlene Dietrich, Randolph Scott and John Wayne also appeared together that same year in a movie called Pittsburgh. At the time, Scott was under contract to Universal, whereas Wayne was borrowed from Republic. Therefore, Scott was billed above Wayne in both movies, even though Wayne's role was larger and more important in each. Dietrich and Wayne had also made the earlier film Seven Sinners together in 1940.

Bestselling poet Robert W. Service (not credited) plays The Poet, a fictionalized version of himself.

The film was nominated for an Oscar for Best Art Direction (John B. Goodman, Jack Otterson, Russell A. Gausman and Edward Ray Robinson).

== Plot ==
Nome, Alaska, 1900: Flapjack and Banty come to town to check on their gold mine claim. Saloon owner Cherry Malotte is aware of the corruption all around, including that Bennett and Clark are out to steal the men's claim.

In on the scheme is the new gold commissioner, Alexander McNamara, as well as the last word of law and order in the territory, Judge Stillman.

Cherry's old beau, Roy Glennister, returns from a trip to Europe. He is attracted to Helen Chester, the judge's niece. Roy makes the mistake of siding with McNamara, damaging his relationship with his longtime partner, Al Dextry.

Roy realizes he's been deceived as McNamara and Stillman prepare to steal at least $250,000 while the mine's case awaits appeal. Helen is now in love with Roy, who begs Dextry's forgiveness and persuades him to rob a bank to take back the wealth stolen from them. Both Glennister and Dextry don blackface to disguise themselves.

The Bronco Kid kills the marshall, but Roy gets the blame. He is arrested and a plot forms to kill him, but Cherry comes to his rescue by breaking Roy out of jail. A fierce fistfight with McNamara results in Roy getting back his mine and his girl.

== Cast ==
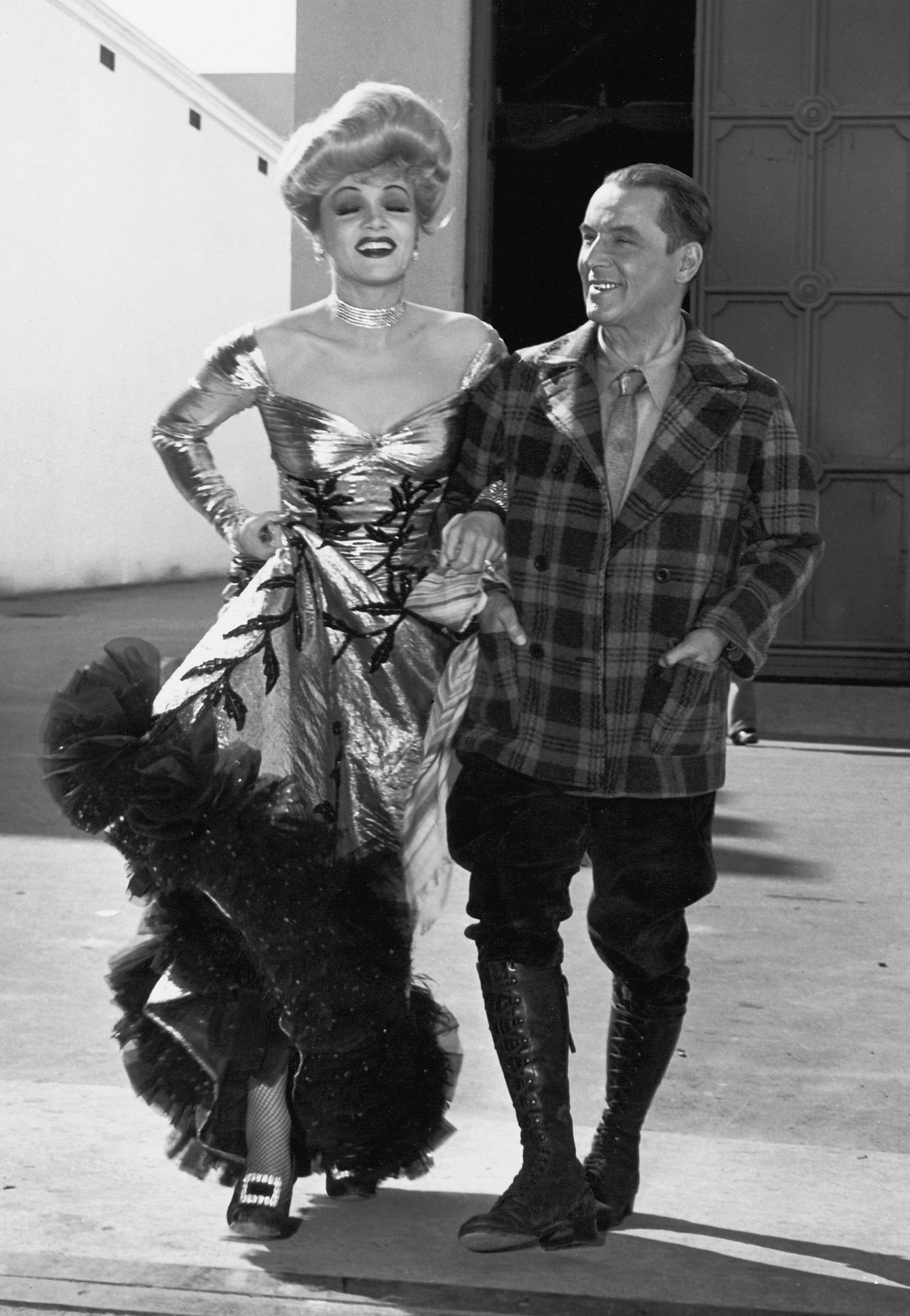
Dietrich and Robert W. Service on the set.

- Marlene Dietrich as Cherry Malotte
- Randolph Scott as Alex McNamara
- John Wayne as Roy Glennister
- Margaret Lindsay as Helen Chester
- Harry Carey as Al Dextry
- Richard Barthelmess as Bronco Kid Farrow
- George Cleveland as Banty
- Samuel S. Hinds as Judge Stillman
- Russell Simpson as Flapjack Sims
- William Farnum as Wheaton
- Marietta Canty as Idabelle
- Jack Norton as Mr. Skinner
- Ray Bennett as Clark
- Forrest Taylor as Bennett
- Art Miles as Deputy
- Charles McMurphy as Deputy
- Charles Halton as Struve
- Bud Osborne as Marshall
- Drew Demorest as Galloway

== See also ==
- Marlene Dietrich filmography
- Randolph Scott filmography
- John Wayne filmography
- Seven Sinners (1940 film), with Marlene Dietrich and John Wayne
- Pittsburgh (1942 film), with Marlene Dietrich, Randolph Scott, and John Wayne
