= Hans J. Salter =

Austrian-American film composer

Hans J. Salter

Hans J. Salter (January 14, 1896 in Vienna – July 23, 1994 in Studio City, California) was an Austrian-American film composer.

== Biography ==
Salter gained his education from the Vienna Academy of Music and studied composition with Alban Berg, Franz Schreker, and others. He worked for the Berlin State Opera before being hired in 1928 to compose music at UFA studios. Salter emigrated to America in 1937 and was quickly put under contract at Universal, where he worked for nearly 30 years, arranging, composing, conducting, and serving as music director.

He composed mainly for Universal, most famously for horror and science fiction films but also for other studios and for television. His most celebrated scores include The Wolf Man (1941), Scarlet Street (1945), Creature from the Black Lagoon (1954), and The Incredible Shrinking Man (1957). Salter was nominated for an Academy Award for several films, including Christmas Holiday (1944) and This Love Of Ours (1945). Much of his output for Universal, where it was used as stock music in minor pictures, was uncredited. Notable non-horror scores include the Western Bend of the River (1953) and the swashbucklers Against All Flags (1952) and The Black Shield of Falworth (1954), Universal's first Cinemascope production. Tracks from his scores for The Golden Horde and Creature from the Black Lagoon were reused in the American cut of the Japanese film King Kong vs. Godzilla in 1963.

Salter died in Studio City, California on July 23, 1994, at the age of 98, and was interred in the Hollywood Forever Cemetery.

== Selected film credits ==
- The Office Manager (1931)
- The True Jacob (1931)
- Gloria (1931)
- Holzapfel Knows Everything (1932)
- My Friend the Millionaire (1932)
- Madame Wants No Children (1933)
- Everything for the Company (1935)
- Fräulein Lilli (1936)
- Legion of Lost Flyers (1939)
- Man from Montreal (1939)
- Enemy Agent (1940)
- The Invisible Man Returns (1940)
- Seven Sinners (1940)
- It Started with Eve (1941)
- Mutiny in the Arctic (1941)
- The Ghost of Frankenstein (1942)
- The Spoilers (1942)
- Pittsburgh (1942)
- The Amazing Mrs. Holliday (1943)
- The Strange Death of Adolf Hitler (1943)
- Sherlock Holmes Faces Death (1943)
- Son of Dracula (1943)
- His Butler's Sister (1943)
- The Spider Woman (1943)
- Phantom Lady (1944)
- The Invisible Man's Revenge (1944)
- Christmas Holiday (1944)
- San Diego, I Love You (1944)
- House of Frankenstein (1944)
- Can't Help Singing (1944)
- Patrick the Great (1945)
- This Love of Ours (1945)
- Scarlet Street (1945)
- So Goes My Love (1946)
- Lover Come Back (1946)
- Magnificent Doll (1946)
- The Michigan Kid (1947)
- The Web (1947)
- That's My Man (1947)
- Love from a Stranger (1947)
- The Sign of the Ram (1948)
- Man-Eater of Kumaon (1948)
- An Innocent Affair (1948)
- Cover Up (1949)
- The Reckless Moment (1949)
- Borderline (1950)
- Please Believe Me (1950)
- The Killer That Stalked New York (1950)
- Frenchie (1950)
- Tomahawk (1951)
- Apache Drums (1951)
- The Prince Who Was a Thief (1951)
- Thunder on the Hill (1951)
- You Never Can Tell (1951)
- The Golden Horde (1951)
- Bend of the River (1952)
- Flesh and Fury (1952)
- The Battle at Apache Pass (1952)
- Untamed Frontier (1952)
- Against All Flags (1952)
- The Human Jungle (1954)
- Sign of the Pagan (1954)
- The Far Horizons (1955)
- Wichita (1955)
- Red Sundown (1956)
- Navy Wife (1956)
- The Rawhide Years (1956)
- Autumn Leaves (1956)
- Hold Back the Night (1956)
- The Oklahoman (1957)
- The Tall Stranger (1957)
- The Female Animal (1958)
- Day of the Badman (1958)
- Raw Wind in Eden (1958)
- The Man in the Net (1959)
- The Wild and the Innocent (1959)
- The Gunfight at Dodge City (1959)
- Come September (1961)
- Hitler (1962)
- Follow That Dream (1962)
- If a Man Answers (1962)
- King Kong vs. Godzilla (1963) U.S. version
- Showdown (1963)
- Bedtime Story (1964)
- Gunpoint (1966)
- Incident at Phantom Hill (1966)
- Beau Geste (1966)
- Return of the Gunfighter (1967)

== Biographies ==
=== Interview ===
- Hans J. Salter: "Als ich 1937 nach Hollywood kam, lag das Land noch immer in tiefster Depression". In: Christian Cargnelli, Michael Omasta (eds.): Aufbruch ins Ungewisse. Österreichische Filmschaffende in der Emigration vor 1945. Vienna, Wespennest: 1993.
