= An Evening with Marlene Dietrich =

- Cover of the DVD An Evening with Marlene Dietrich.
- Also known as: I Wish You Love
- Genre: Television Special
- Directed by: Clark Jones
- Starring: Marlene Dietrich
- Country of origin: United Kingdom
- Original language: English

Production
- Executive producer: Alexander H. Cohen
- Producer: Ernest Maxin
- Production locations: New London Theatre, London
- Camera setup: Multi-camera
- Running time: 54 minutes

Original release
- Network: BBC
- Release: 1 January 1973

An Evening With Marlene Dietrich is a concert-format television special, starring Marlene Dietrich, first broadcast in 1973.

== Production ==
Alexander H. Cohen, who had produced Dietrich's successful Broadway runs of her one-woman show in 1967 and 1968, suggested a television version of her show.

Dietrich would receive a fee of $250,000 for her participation in the project. It was said at the time that this was the highest one-shot fee ever paid to a performer to appear on television. After two airings (one in the UK and one in the US), the copyright on the show would revert to Dietrich.

Dietrich—wary of television as a medium—insisted that the show be filmed in a legitimate theatre in Europe, to best capture her act and audience reaction thereto. The New London Theatre in London was chosen as location for filming, although the theatre would still be under construction at the time of filming. (The theatre would only officially open the following year.)

Lighting designer Joe Davis was brought in to recreate Dietrich's stage lighting and designer Rouben Ter-Arutunian designed a set featuring scrims and incorporating a Dietrich sketch by René Bouche. Dietrich's costumes were by Jean Louis, and Stan Freeman conducted the orchestra, using orchestrations of the Dietrich repertoire by Burt Bacharach.

Taping took place on November 23 and November 24, 1972. Dietrich gave two complete shows to non-paying, invitee-only audiences. Shots of Dietrich interacting with the audience were also taped at the end of the second concert. She also shot retakes of "Lili Marlene" and "Falling in Love Again (Can't Help It)" (the latter both in English and German) sans audience against a black velour backdrop to facilitate a post-production split-screen montage of her singing beside old black and white stills from the 1930s and 1940s. The best selections from the various tapings would be combined to form the final, one-hour-long special.

== Repertoire ==
A set-list of twenty songs was devised for the taping, including foreign-language selections in French and German, which would facilitate variant edits for differing European markets:

- "I Get a Kick Out of You"
- "You're the Cream in My Coffee"
- "My Blue Heaven"
- "See What the Boys in the Back Room Will Have"
- "The Laziest Gal in Town"
- "When the World Was Young"
- "Johnny"
- "Go 'Way From My Window"
- "I Wish You Love"
- "White Grass"
- "Boomerang Baby"
- "La Vie en Rose"
- "Allein in Einer Grossen Stadt"
- "Lola"
- "Das Lied ist Aus"
- "Marie Marie"
- "Lili Marlene"
- "Where Have All the Flowers Gone?"
- "Honeysuckle Rose"
- "Falling in Love Again (Can't Help It)"

== Broadcast ==
Dietrich performing in the TV special An Evening with Marlene Dietrich.

Originally titled I Wish You Love, the show premiered in the UK on the BBC on January 1, 1973, and in the U.S. on January 13, 1973, on CBS Television (sponsored by Kraft Foods). The original UK runtime was 54 minutes, but the show was trimmed down to 50 minutes to meet US network demands.

To promote the show, Dietrich had a photo sitting with Milton Greene, which produced a famous portrait of her, appearing to wear nothing but her famous swansdown coat.

CBS organised a press conference with Dietrich at the Waldorf-Astoria Hotel and an exclusive interview with Rex Reed to publicize the US network showing. At the conference and in her interview with Reed, Dietrich - to the surprise of her producers and the network - slammed the show, claiming it wasn't on par with her live shows, that rehearsal time was severely limited and that the show was technically inept.

Despite her statements, the show garnered good (if not spectacular) ratings and generally positive reviews from the press.

As a result of her interviews, she was sued by producer Alexander H. Cohen - successfully in the UK, but unsuccessfully in the US.

After its initial US and UK broadcasts, varying edits of the show were broadcast around the world, including Australia, Germany, France, Spain and South Africa.

== Home video ==
For its home video release in the 1980s, the show was retitled An Evening with Marlene Dietrich (its current title).

A DVD version released by EMI in 2003 included five previously unreleased songs. The Dietrich estate sued EMI-Toshiba for including these unlicensed selections without their permission.

Previously unseen alternate takes of "Lola" and "You're the Cream in My Coffee" were included as bonus features on the Kino DVD release of The Blue Angel. This material comes from the Marlene Dietrich Collection Berlin, which holds all unissued material related to the television special as part of its collection.

== See also ==
- Marlene Dietrich filmography
