= Randolph Scott filmography =

Randolph Scott (1898–1987) appeared in over one hundred feature films during his career.

== Feature films ==
Year	Title	Role	Director	Notes
1928	Sharp Shooters	Foreign Serviceman in Moroccan Cafe	John G. Blystone	Released in the United Kingdom under the title Three Naval Rascals
1929	Weary River	Man in Audience	Frank Lloyd	
1929	The Far Call	Helms	Allan Dwan	
1929	The Black Watch	Bit Part	John Ford	Released in the United Kingdom under the title King of the Khyber Rifles
1929	Sailor's Holiday	Undetermined Role	Fred C. Newmeyer	
1929	The Virginian	Rider extra	Victor Fleming	
1929	Dynamite	Undetermined Role	Cecil B. DeMille	
1930	Born Reckless	Dick Milburn	John Ford; Andrew Benniston	
1931	Women Men Marry	Steve Bradley	Charles Hutchison	
1932	Sky Bride	Captain Frank Robertson	Stephen Roberts	
1932	A Successful Calamity	Larry Rivers, the Polo Coach	John G. Adolfi	
1932	Heritage of the Desert	Jack Hare	Henry Hathaway	Reissued under the title When the West Was Young
1932	Hot Saturday	Bill Fadden	William A. Seiter	
1932	Wild Horse Mesa	Chane Weymer	Henry Hathaway	
1933	Hello, Everybody!	Hunt Blake	William A. Seiter	
1933	The Thundering Herd	Tom Doan	Henry Hathaway	Reissued under the title Buffalo Stampede
1933	Murders in the Zoo	Dr. Jack Woodford	A. Edward Sutherland	
1933	Supernatural	Grant Wilson	Victor Halperin	
1933	Sunset Pass	Ash Preston	Henry Hathaway	
1933	Cocktail Hour	Randolph Morgan	Victor Schertzinger	
1933	Man of the Forest	Brett Dale	Henry Hathaway	Reissued under the title Challenge of the Frontier
1933	To the Last Man	Lynn Hayden	Henry Hathaway	Reissued under the title Law of Vengeance
1933	Broken Dreams	Dr. Robert Morley	Robert Vignola	
1934	The Last Round-Up	Jim Cleve	Henry Hathaway	
1934	Wagon Wheels	Clint Belmet	Charles Barton	Reissued under the title Caravans West
1935	Home on the Range	Tom Hatfield	Arthur Jacobson	
1935	Rocky Mountain Mystery	Larry Sutton	Charles Barton	Reissued under the title The Fighting Westerner
1935	Roberta	John Kent	William A. Seiter	
1935	Village Tale	T.N. "Slaughter" Somerville	John Cromwell	
1935	She	Leo Vincey	Irving Pichel; Lansing C. Holden	
1935	So Red the Rose	Duncan Bedford	King Vidor	
1936	Follow the Fleet	CPO Bilge Smith	Mark Sandrich	
1936	And Sudden Death	Lt. James Knox	Charles Barton	
1936	The Last of the Mohicans	Hawkeye	George B. Seitz	
1936	Go West, Young Man	Bud Norton	Henry Hathaway	
1937	High, Wide and Handsome	Peter Cortlandt	Rouben Mamoulian	
1938	Rebecca of Sunnybrook Farm	Tony Kent	Allan Dwan	
1938	The Texans	Kirk Jordan	James P. Hogan	
1938	The Road to Reno	Steve Fortness	S. Sylan Simon	Reissued under the title The Ranger and the Lady
1939	Jesse James	Marshall Will Wright	Henry King	Technicolor
1939	Susannah of the Mounties	Inspector Angus "Monty" Montague	William A. Sieter	Sepiatone
1939	Frontier Marshal	Wyatt Earp	Allan Dwan	
1939	Coast Guard	Thomas "Speed" Bradshaw	Edward Ludwig	
1939	20,000 Men a Year	Brad Reynolds	Alfred E. Green	
1940	Virginia City	Capt. Vance Irby	Michael Curtiz	Sepiatone
1940	My Favorite Wife	Stephen Burkett	Garson Kanin	
1940	When the Daltons Rode	Tod Jackson	George Marshall	
1941	Western Union	Vance Shaw	Fritz Lang	Technicolor
1941	Belle Starr	Sam Starr	Irving Cummings	Technicolor
1941	Paris Calling	Nick	Edwin L. Marin	Reissued under the title Paris Bombshell
1942	To the Shores of Tripoli	Sgt. Dixie Smith	H. Bruce Humberstone	Technicolor
1942	The Spoilers	Alexander McNamara	Ray Enright	
1942	Pittsburgh	John "Cash" Evans	Lewis Seiler	
1943	Bombardier	Captain Buck Oliver	Ricard Wallace	
1943	The Desperadoes	Sheriff Steve Upton	Charles Vidor	Technicolor
1943	Corvette K-225	Lt. Cmdr. McLain	Richard Rosson	Released in the United Kingdom under the title The Nelson Touch
1943	Gung Ho!	Colonel Thorwald	Ray Enright	
1944	Follow the Boys	Himself	Edward Sutherland	
1944	Belle of the Yukon	Honest John Calhoun	William A. Seiter	Technicolor
1945	China Sky	Dr. Gray Thompson	Ray Enright	
1945	Captain Kidd	Adam Mercy	Rowland V. Lee	
1946	Abilene Town	Dan Mitchell	Edwin L. Marin	
1946	Badman's Territory	Mark Rowley	Tim Whelan	RKO
1946	Home, Sweet Homicide	Lt. Bill Smith	Lloyd Bacon	
1947	Trail Street	Marshal Bat Masterson	Ray Enright	RKO
1947	Gunfighters	Brazos Kane	George Waggner	Cinecolor; Released in the United Kingdom under the title The Assassin
1947	Christmas Eve	Jonathan	Edwin L. Marin	Reissued under the title Sinner's Holiday
1948	Albuquerque	Cole Armin	Ray Enright	Cinecolor; Released in the United Kingdom under the title Silver City
1948	Coroner Creek	Chris Danning	Ray Enright	Cinecolor
1948	Return of the Bad Men	Marshal Vance Cordell	Ray Enright	RKO Mbr />Also released under the slightly altered title of Return of the Badmen
1949	The Walking Hills	Jim Carey	John Sturges	
1949	Canadian Pacific	Tom Andrews	Edwin L. Marin	Cinecolor
1949	The Doolins of Oklahoma	Bill Doolin	Gordon Douglas	Released in the United Kingdom under the title The Great Manhunt
1949	Fighting Man of the Plains	Jim Dancer	Edwin L. Marin	Cinecolor
1950	The Nevadan	Andrew Barclay	Gordon Douglas	Cinecolor; Released in the United Kingdom under the title The Man from Nevada
1950	Colt .45	Steve Farrell	Edwin L. Marin	Technicolor; Reissued under the title Thundercloud
1950	The Cariboo Trail	Jim Redfern	Edwin L. Marin	Cinecolor
1951	Sugarfoot	Jackson "Sugarfoot" Redan	Edwin L. Marin	Technicolor; Reissued under the title Swirl of Glory
1951	Santa Fe	Britt Canfield	Irving Pichel	Technicolor
1951	Fort Worth	Ned Britt	Edwin L. Marin	Technicolor
1951	Man in the Saddle	Owen Merritt	André de Toth	Technicolor; Released in the United Kingdom under the title The Outcast
1951	Starlift	Himself	Roy Del Ruth	
1952	Carson City	Silent Jeff Kincaid	André de Toth	WarnerColor
1952	Hangman's Knot	Major Matt Stewart	Roy Huggins	Technicolor
1953	The Man Behind the Gun	Major Ransome Callicut	Felix Feist	Technicolor
1953	The Stranger Wore a Gun	Jeff Travis	André de Toth	3-D; Technicolor
1953	Thunder Over the Plains	Captain David Porter	André de Toth	Technicolor
1954	Riding Shotgun	Larry Delong	André de Toth	WarnerColor
1954	The Bounty Hunter	Jim Kipp	André de Toth	WarnerColor; Reputedly filmed, but not released, in 3-D
1955	Ten Wanted Men	John Stewart	H. Bruce Humberstone	Technicolor
1955	Rage at Dawn	James Barlow	Tim Whelan	Technicolor
1955	Tall Man Riding	Larry Madden	Lesley Selander	WarnerColor
1955	A Lawless Street	Marshal Calem Ware	Joseph H. Lewis	Technicolor
1956	Seven Men from Now	Ben Stride	Budd Boetticher	WarnerColor
1956	7th Cavalry	Capt. Tom Benson	Joseph H. Lewis	Technicolor
1957	The Tall T	Pat Brennan	Budd Boetticher	Technicolor
1957	Shoot-Out at Medicine Bend	Capt. Buck Devlin	Richard Bare	Filmed in 1955
1957	Decision at Sundown	Bart Allison	Budd Boetticher	Technicolor
1958	Buchanan Rides Alone	Tom Buchanan	Budd Boetticher	Technicolor
1959	Westbound	Capt. John Hayes	Budd Boetticher	WarnerColor
1959	Ride Lonesome	Ben Brigade	Budd Boetticher	CinemaScope; Eastmancolor
1960	Comanche Station	Jefferson Cody	Budd Boetticher	CinemaScope; Eastmancolor
1962	Ride the High Country	Gil Westrum	Sam Peckinpah	CinemaScope; Metrocolor; Filmed with Panavision, released in CinemaScope; Released in the United Kingdom under the title Guns in the Afternoon

== Short films ==
Year	Title	Role	Director	Notes
1935	Pirate Party on Catalina Isle	Himself	Gene Burdette	Technicolor
1941	Meet the Stars #6: Stars at Play	Himself	Gene Parsons	
1951	Screen Snapshots: Hollywood Goes Western	Himself	Ralph Staub	
1953	Screen Snapshots: Men of the West	Himself	Ralph Staub	

== Television ==
Scott's only venture into television (other than an appearance on Celebrity Golf) was in the late 1950s as host of the proposed Randolph Scott's Theater of the West series. The pilot starred Scott Brady as a lawman trying to escape a criminal past. The series was never sold and the pilot episode never aired.
