= Asen Nikolov (officer) =

Bulgarian military officer

Asen Nikolov (Bulgarian: Асен Николов Николов; 12 September 1891 – 1946) was a Bulgarian Lieutenant-General who fought in World War II.

== Biography ==
He was born on 12 September 1891 in the town of Yambol. He graduated from the Military School in Sofia in 1912. From 1923 he served in the Varna coastal fortress. In 1934 he became head of the Artillery School in Sofia. From 1936 he was chief of the Artillery Department of the Second Military Inspection District and chief of the Air Defense of the Artillery Inspection.

In 1938 he was appointed commander of the 2nd Thracian Infantry Division. From 1941 he was commander of the Bulgarian 1st Occupation Corps which collaborated with the German Army in the Axis occupation of Serbia. When Bulgaria switched sides in the second World War, he was taken prisoner by the Germans on 4 September 1944. In October 1944, he refused to join the creation of a Bulgarian military unit to fight on the German side. In December he also refused to enter in the Anti-Communist government in exile of Alexander Tsankov. In the period December 1944 - May 1945 he was a prisoner of war in the Oflag-8 camp in Germany.

On 15 March 1945 he was sentenced in absentia to death by the Fourth Supreme Chamber of the People's Court of Bulgaria, but the Supreme Court of Cassation overturned the sentence because it had been proven he was a prisoner of war. After his return to Bulgaria, he was arrested and executed anyhow in 1946.

== Sources ==
- generals.dk
- the article in the Bulgarian Wikipedia, Асен Николов (генерал-лейтенант).
- boinaslava
