= Soldatensender Belgrad =

German military radio station during World War II

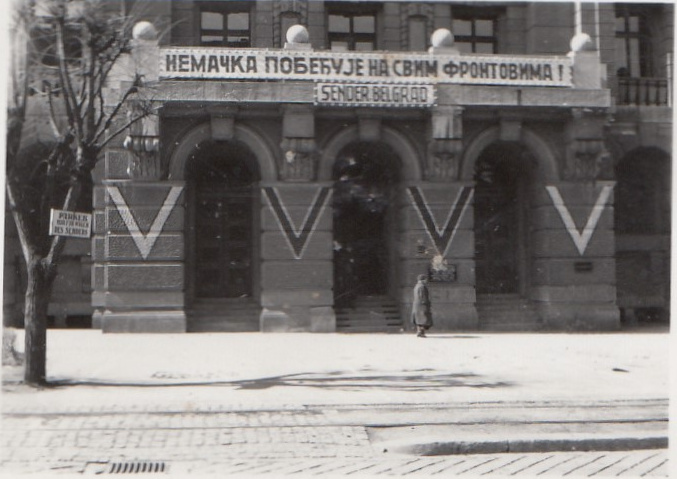
The building used by Soldatensender Belgrad in Belgrade, photographed in 1942.

Soldatensender Belgrad (German for "Soldiers' Radio Belgrade"), also known as Sender Belgrad, was a German military radio station and propaganda broadcaster based in Belgrade in the German-occupied territory of Serbia during World War II. Established following the invasion and occupation of Yugoslavia in April 1941, it served German military personnel across multiple theatres of war, with its broadcasts reaching across much of Europe and North Africa. The station also transmitted Serbian-language news, political, cultural and entertainment programming to the population of occupied Serbia.

The station became internationally known for its role in popularizing Lale Andersen's recording of "Lili Marleen". Recorded in 1939 to little initial success, the song began to be broadcast from Belgrade in 1941 and became a regular feature of the station's evening programming. The broadcasts helped transform it into an international wartime phenomenon heard by both Axis and Allied soldiers, making Lili Marleen the station's most enduring cultural legacy.

After the German evacuation of Belgrade in 1944, Soldatensender Belgrad was relocated to Austria, where broadcasts from Bad Sauerbrunn continued until January 1945.

== History ==
Pre-war Radio Belgrade ceased broadcasting on 6 April 1941 after its studio in the Serbian Royal Academy was damaged during the German bombing of Belgrade. German authorities subsequently transferred undamaged studio equipment to the building at 16 Kneza Miloša Street that had housed the pre-war shortwave station of the Central Press Bureau. Broadcasting resumed under German control by 21 April 1941 under the name Sender Belgrad.

During the German occupation of Serbia, Sender Belgrad used bars from Prinz Eugen, der edle Ritter as its interval signal. The signal included the line referring to the "city and fortress of Belgrade", an allusion to the Habsburg capture of the city in 1717.

Radio Belgrade was placed under German occupation control. The Propaganda-Abteilung Südost operated from the same building, while officers of Propaganda-Abteilung Serbien were directly involved in radio operations. Lieutenant Karl-Heinz Reintgen played a leading role in the station's German staff, while Robert Vege, a local ethnic German associated with pre-war Radio Belgrade, served as its formal director.

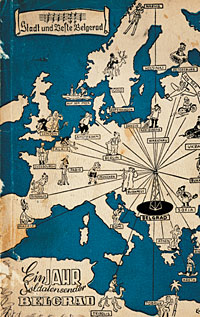
A 1942 promotional map published by Soldatensender Belgrad, depicting the station's claimed reach across Europe and North Africa.

The station developed into a German military broadcaster with an audience extending far beyond occupied Serbia. Its programmes served German military personnel deployed across several theatres of war, while the reach of its transmitter allowed broadcasts from Belgrade to be heard across much of Europe and North Africa.

The medium-wave transmitter was situated at Makiš, on the outskirts of Belgrade. Although its power was relatively modest, favourable ground conditions in the marshland between the Sava and Danube increased its effective range.

In April 1942, the Belgrade station was grouped with German military stations in Athens and Thessaloniki as the Wehrmachtsendergruppe Südost.

Control of the station reflected broader institutional rivalries within Nazi Germany. On 24 May 1941, Foreign Minister Joachim von Ribbentrop arranged for Radio Belgrade and its medium-wave transmitter to be acquired through the Foreign Ministry's Interradio organization. This placed the station largely outside the direct authority of Joseph Goebbels's Reich Ministry of Public Enlightenment and Propaganda, despite later attempts by the ministry to impose its domestic broadcasting rules on military stations.

This relative institutional independence later became significant to the station's musical programming. Soldatensender Belgrad developed a reputation for entertainment and dance music that differed considerably from the more tightly controlled programming heard on domestic German radio.

== Programming and propaganda ==
The station's principal German-language audience consisted of German military personnel deployed across several theatres of war. Its schedule included news bulletins, reports from the German High Command, commentary on current events, military music, popular entertainment and request programmes intended to connect soldiers at the front with their families at home.

Programming was subsequently expanded to include broadcasts directed at the Serbian population. Serbian-language programmes included news, political speeches, music, drama, cultural material and educational broadcasts. Members of the collaborationist administration headed by Milan Nedić, including government ministers, used radio addresses as part of their political propaganda, and their speeches were also reproduced in the occupation press.

From 1942, the Serbian-language service was expanded further. Programming included literature, art, children's programmes and German-language instruction. The Serbian collaborationist administration participated in producing parts of this programming through its propaganda institutions, but the German occupation authorities retained ultimate control over the station.

Radio broadcasting formed part of the wider system of information control in occupied Serbia. In May 1941, the German military authorities permitted reception of German-controlled stations while prohibiting listening to Allied broadcasters, particularly broadcasts from London and Radio Moscow. Loudspeakers carrying news, official announcements and propaganda were installed in public places.

The collaborationist authorities also introduced compulsory radio subscriptions. In June 1943, an ordinance required designated Serbian-language informational broadcasts to be relayed and listened to in public establishments equipped with radio receivers.

Music and entertainment occupied an unusually prominent place in the station's output. Numerous musicians, singers and ensembles from occupied Belgrade participated in its broadcasts. Musicologist Maja Vasiljević has described Sender Belgrad as an important link between the musical institutions of occupied Belgrade and those of the Third Reich.

Friedrich Meyer became responsible for the station's musical programming in 1942 and organized a dance orchestra that included local musicians. The station's position largely outside the direct control of the Propaganda Ministry gave it greater latitude than domestic German broadcasters in its choice of entertainment music.

By 1944 this difference had become sufficiently pronounced to cause friction in Berlin. Hans Hinkel, a senior Propaganda Ministry official, complained about the particularly popular dance music broadcast by Soldatensender Belgrad, while military stations continued to disregard some entertainment guidelines imposed on German domestic broadcasting.

== Lili Marleen ==
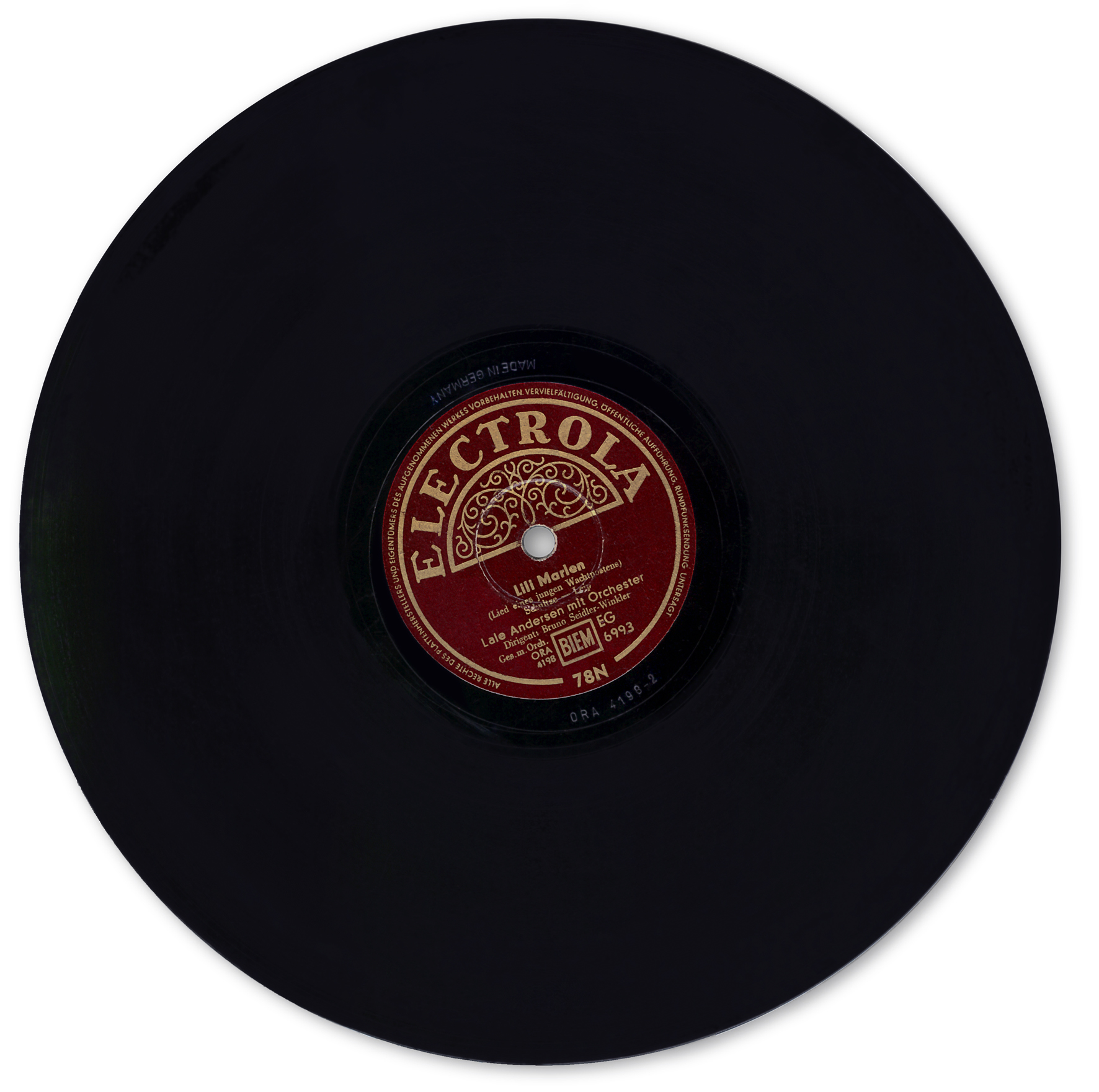
Lale Andersen's 1939 Electrola recording of "Lili Marleen"; broadcasts from Belgrade in 1941 helped turn the song into an international wartime hit.

Soldatensender Belgrad's wide wartime reach played a central role in the rise of "Lili Marleen". The song, based on a poem by Hans Leip, set to music by Norbert Schultze and recorded by Lale Andersen in 1939, initially attracted little commercial attention.

According to historian Katja Protte, Andersen's recording was probably first played by Soldatensender Belgrad on 27 or 28 April 1941. The station initially had only a limited collection of records, and the recording was played repeatedly. When it was temporarily removed from the programme, protests from listeners demonstrated its growing popularity.

On 18 August 1941, Reintgen established a daily greetings programme that ended shortly before 10 p.m. with Lili Marleen. Letters from soldiers and their relatives were read on air, turning the programme into a symbolic connection between the front and home. The regular time slot, request format and wide reach of Soldatensender Belgrad helped transform Andersen's recording into a wartime phenomenon.

Its popularity soon extended beyond German forces. Allied soldiers also listened to the song, particularly in the Mediterranean and North African theatres, and translations and adaptations appeared in several languages. The Haus der Geschichte identifies the broadcasts from Belgrade as the starting point for the song's development into a phenomenon shared by soldiers on opposing sides of the war.

The song and Andersen had an uneasy relationship with Nazi cultural policy. The Propaganda Ministry objected to Andersen's conduct and attempted to restrict her career and the circulation of her recordings. Soldatensender Belgrad, however, did not operate under the same degree of direct Propaganda Ministry control as domestic German stations, complicating attempts to enforce such restrictions on its programming.

The extraordinary popularity of the song subsequently generated a body of anecdotes and legends about the station. Accounts differed over how the record originally reached Belgrade, the circumstances under which it was removed and restored to the schedule, the involvement of senior German military figures and the scale of listener correspondence. Protte notes that the documented history of the song became increasingly intertwined with a post-war mythology surrounding Lili Marleen.

One Serbian account, citing jazz historian Mihailo Blam and explicitly describing the story as an unconfirmed legend, held that a letter reached occupied Belgrade from the United States containing a 20-dollar bill and a request that the station play Lili Marleen.

The station's association with the song became its most enduring cultural legacy. A recording that had attracted little attention before the war became one of the best-known songs of World War II, crossing linguistic and military front lines and becoming closely identified with the experience of soldiers separated from home.

== Evacuation from Belgrade ==
As the military situation in the Balkans deteriorated in 1944 and Soviet and Yugoslav Partisan forces approached Belgrade, the German station was evacuated from the city. After the liberation of Belgrade, Radio Belgrade resumed regular broadcasting under Yugoslav control on 10 November 1944.

Soldatensender Belgrad itself continued operating after its evacuation. In the autumn of 1944, the station was relocated to the Hartigvilla in Bad Sauerbrunn, Austria. According to Austrian historian Gerald Schlag, broadcasts from the Hartigvilla continued until January 1945.

== See also ==
- Propaganda in Nazi Germany
- Radio propaganda
- Radio Belgrade
- Axis occupation of Serbia
- Lili Marleen
