= Karl-Heinz Reintgen =

Karl-Heinz Reintgen (1915 – 17 September 1990) was a German journalist, who served as editor-in-chief of radio and television and then as deputy director-general of Saarländischer Rundfunk (Saarland Broadcasting Corporation) between 1968 and 1980. He served as a journalist in the broadcast service operated by the German armed forced during World War II and held the rank of lieutenant in the Army. As head of Radio Belgrade, then a German military radio station, he is credited with making the tune "Lili Marleen" widely known.

== Career ==
Reintgen started his radio career as early as 1935. Among other commands during WW-II he was in charge of the German Army's Soldatensender Belgrad, situated in Belgrade, Yugoslavia. He is credited with making the tune "Lili Marleen" by Lale Anderson a war-time theme for troops on both sides by playing it every evening at 9.55 PM. He was portrayed by Herb Andress in Rainer Werner Fassbinder's film Lili Marleen.

In 1961 he entered the service of the Saarländischer Rundfunk. He built up the TV program "Aktuelles Fernsehen." In 1968 he was promoted to editor-in-chief for all radio and TV programs. From 1971 until 1980 he was the deputy director-general of the Saarländischer Rundfunk.

== Honours ==
In 1976 he was awarded the Federal Cross of Merit.
