= The Orchid Gardener =

- Directed by: Lars von Trier
- Written by: Lars von Trier
- Produced by: Lars von Trier
- Starring: Lars von Trier; Inger Hvidtfeldt
- Narrated by: Jesper Hoffmeyer
- Cinematography: Lars von Trier; Hartvig Jensen; Helge Kaj; Peter Nørgaard; Mogens Svane
- Edited by: Lars von Trier
- Production company: Filmgruppe 16
- Release dates: May 6, 1977 (Denmark); September 13, 2001 (Athens)
- Running time: 37 minutes
- Country: Denmark
- Language: Danish

The Orchid Gardener (Danish: Orchidégartneren) is a 1977 Danish featurette drama film written, produced, shot, edited, and directed by Lars von Trier.

== Plot ==
The film consists of a series of scenes, the chronological order of which is ambiguous, loosely relaying the experiences of the protagonist Victor Marse (Lars von Trier), whose actual name is Felimann von Marseburg. Victor is introduced by means of voice-over narration (Jesper Hoffmeyer) as a young artist of Jewish descent who has shunned his heritage. He is described as having arrived at the realisation that he is alone, doubting humanity's willingness to extend help to one another. Further details are provided, including the fact that he was called a wimp at one point in his life, which led to a dread of weakness and incompetence. Victor believes that he must keep his mind busy and therefore decides to cultivate his love for Eliza, a young nurse he encounters during his stay at a sanatorium.

Whilst in residence at the sanatorium, Victor observes the intimate friendship between Eliza and her female friend, also a nurse. It is suggested they are lovers. It is ambiguous as to which nurse is specifically Eliza, which is further enunciated by a recurring voice-over that states ‘I am not Eliza’. Victor is portrayed as exhibiting a sense of dependence upon the nurses; in one scene he waits upon one nurse to dry and swaddle him in a towel following a shower, and in the following scene he uses a wheelchair. He is wheeled through the gardens of the sanatorium by one of the nurses, potentially Eliza, towards whom he expresses a tenderness by clasping her hand. Victor and the accompanying nurse pass a gardener and a woman painting on a large canvas, both of whom Victor greets with a smile. Arriving at a tree, the nurse gathers handfuls of blossoms, which she begins to gently sprinkle onto Victor's hair. She is interrupted by the call of another nurse, Eliza's friend. Leaving Victor seated in his chair, the nurses walk into the distance, with Eliza's friend retrieving from her pocket a condom, prompting laughter from both. Victor looks on with a forlorn expression. The sky becomes clouded; the camera tracks along the ground, displaying the painter's canvas and easel as scattered along the grass, with the painter nowhere to be seen. Eliza dashes back to Victor, who is still seated, and wheels him along, harshly dusting the blossoms from his head in the process.

Victor is shown in a household setting, presumably following his period in the sanatorium. He looks on at a woman, one of the former nurses who is now dressed in masculine attire. The narrator describes that Victor had studied women and had come to the conclusion that women always despise that which is weak, driving him to dream of strengthening himself. This narration is accompanied by a scene in which a young child is thrashed and locked in a room by an older, unknown woman; the woman, situated on the other side of the locked door, masturbates against the backdrop of the child's distressed cries.

Returning to the antics of Victor, Victor dons a Nazi military uniform whilst sat before a tabletop mirror. In contrast to the masculine overtones of the garment he applies mascara to his eyes and powder to his face. In the following scene he intensely studies the former nurse brushing her hair and applying cream to her face; as she hums the melody of Lili Marleen, Victor runs his hands along the outline of the head and shoulders, never directly touching her skin. Following this, Victor is shown outside in a derelict urban setting, adjusting his trousers. A doll's pram overturned in the background, and it is indicated by the narrator that Victor has assaulted a young girl.

Eliza, Eliza's friend and Victor attend a cinema screening. While Eliza and her friend sit side by side, an empty chair separates Victor from the couple. The film displays a male and female couple in the midst of an incomprehensible dialogue; while the male figure becomes increasingly animated and emotional, the female figure remains coolly composed and disaffected by the male figure's erratic gesticulations. Eliza and her friend exchange amused glances, while Victor, who sports painted nails, gazes intensely at the screen whilst tightly holding a furled flyer featuring a painting of a man. Once the film concludes, Victor is left alone in the auditorium.

Victor is shown wearing female attire, applying make-up once more, gazing into his tabletop mirror. Running his hands over the contours of his face, he looks into his own reflection for a moment before approaching a nearby birdcage. He removes the bird inside, a pigeon, and rings its neck until the head is removed. He returns to the mirror, dabbing his finger into the head's open wound, using the blood as rouge for his cheeks. In an abrupt change of pace, the next scene shows Victor running frantically down an enclosed street, collapsing as he reaches a dead end. He is then shown at the seashore, perched upon the edge of a pier. The narrator describes how Victor fantasises a hand caressing his own. Victor becomes briefly lost in his imagination, believing a hand to touch his own, only to realise that he is daydreaming and is actually alone.

Back in the household Victor suspends himself from the ceiling, giving the impression of having hanged himself. His female companion, one of the former-nurses, enters the house and eventually arrives at the room in which Victor is hanging. She is not startled and conversely strolls towards the window behind Victor before departing. Infuriated by her response, Victor cuts himself free and flings off the harness that had been supporting him. He runs from the room.

The following scenes show Victor descending into greater anxiety and violence. His sleep is interrupted by distress. He sits for long, inert periods besides an empty canvas. It is implied that he is so bothered by the song of the birds outside of his atelier that he hammers them by their wings against a wall and sets them alight. Finally, he is shown holding a gun to his female companion. She remains composed, as she turns her back to Victor and extends her hand across the wall. She turns back to face him and tells Victor that she cherishes him the way he is, that he should give her a chance, and that it would be foolish for him to shoot her. She asks him why he has never wished to be caressed. Victor's hand tremors and he throws the gun aside. The camera cuts to a wide shot, revealing that the female companion is not clothed except for trousers and a tie; she presents Victor with a whip, which she begins to coat with a viscous substance followed by a white, granular powder. Watching intently, Victor begins to undress.

Clasping his head and body, Victor walks down a mostly empty street. He walks with a pained gait, which increasingly falters. An elderly woman collapses in the distance and a crowd begins to gather, although they do not actually help her but instead stare at her body. Victor remains unacknowledged as he staggers on, almost collapsing entirely. The scenes fades to an image of a nude Victor, collapsed in front of the large canvas, drawn-out hand prints running down the length of the canvas.

In the final scenes of the film Victor is shown driving a hearse to an orchid nursery. As he drives, an English language commercial discouraging smoking plays from the hearse's radio. After removing a formal jacket and bowtie, revealing that he is wearing gardener overalls, he retrieves a cap from inside of the coffin situated in the back of the hearse and then attends to work in the nursery.

The narrator states that Victor truly cherished Eliza, to which a female voice responds ‘No, not Eliza’. The film concludes with a priest driving a wooden cross into the ground.
