= Bulgarian 1st Occupation Corps =

The Bulgarian 1st Occupation Corps was a Bulgarian Army Corps which participated in the Axis occupation of Serbia during World War II.

== Formation ==
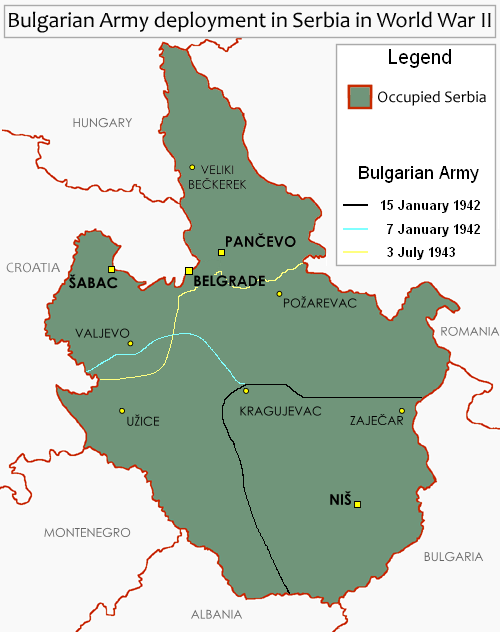
Bulgarian Army deployment in Serbia during World War II.

The Bulgarian Army had not participated in the Invasion of Yugoslavia, but had agreed to take over occupational tasks to free German combat troops.

Initially, for the occupation of Macedonia and Pirot, the Bulgarian military command formed a new Fifth Bulgarian Army led by General Nikola Mihov. The occupation of the territory to be part of Bulgaria began on April 19, 1941 and was completed by May 28, 1941. The Fifth Army did not actually enter beyond Serbian borders before the Balkan War, except for part of Pirot, which was considered a traditional Bulgarian region.

In response to the German requirements for Bulgarian occupation in Serbia itself, at the suggestion of the General Staff, the First Occupation Corps was formed under the command of Lieutenant General Asen Nikolov and Chief of Staff Colonel Stoyko Ivanov. The Corps consisted of the

- 6th Bdin Infantry Division, replaced in 1942 by the 9th Pleven Infantry Division
- 17th Štip Division
- 21st Infantry Division
- 1 Combined Squadron of 7 Assault Fighters Avia B-534 "Dogan" from the airports at Bozhurishte and Vrazhdebna

for a total of about 23,000 soldiers.

In October 1942, several battalions of the 9th Pleven Infantry Division participated in Operation Kopaonik against Mihailović's Chetniks. In January 1943, the Bulgarian area of occupation was expanded westwards and in July 1943, further northwards, for which a fourth division, the 25th Infantry Division was added to the Corps.

By the end of 1943, the Corps was composed of the 7th, 9th, 21st, 22nd, 24th, 25th, and 27th Infantry divisions. The 24th Division participated in Operation Schwarz and Operation Kugelblitz.

The corps began withdrawing from Serbia on August 26, 1944. On September 4, 1944, after it became clear that Konstantin Muraviev's agrarian government would declare war on the Reich, the Corps headquarters were taken prisoner by the German army and some of the remaining Corps units were disarmed by the Germans. The rest of the personnel withdrew to the old borders of Bulgaria, abandoning some of their equipment and heavy weapons during the retreat. Lieutenant General Asen Nikolov and the parts of the Corps that were captured, were taken to POW camps.

The Corps was disbanded on September 23, 1944.

=== Commanders ===
- Major General (Lieutenant General since 1943) Asen Nikolov (April 11, 1942 - September 4, 1944)
- Major General Ivan Popov (September 14, 1944 - September 23, 1944)

== Sources ==
- the article in the Bulgarian Wikipedia, Първи български окупационен корпус.
- War and Revolution in Yugoslavia, 1941-1945: Occupation and Collaboration, by Jozo Tomasevich (Stanford University Press, 9780804736152 January 2002), page 199
- The Bulgarian Army in Yugoslavia 1941–1945, by Boro Mitrovski, Venceslav Glišić, Tomo Ristovski (Medunarodna politika, 1971), page 46
