= Norbert Schultze =

German composer

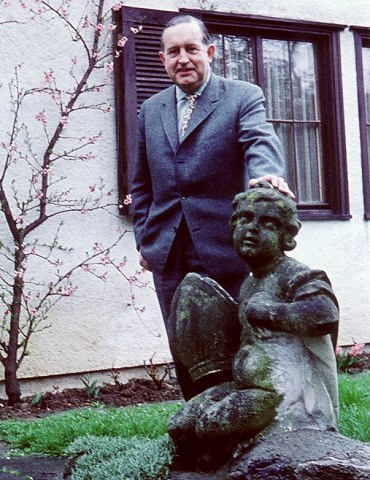
Norbert Schultze in the garden of Artur Beul and Lale Andersen in Zollikon

Norbert Arnold Wilhelm Richard Schultze (26 January 1911 in Brunswick – 14 October 2002 in Bad Tölz) was a prolific German composer of film music and a member of the NSDAP and of Joseph Goebbels' staff during World War II. He is best remembered for having written the melody of the World War II classic "Lili Marleen", originally a poem from the 1915 book Die kleine Hafenorgel by Hans Leip.

Other works were the operas Schwarzer Peter and Das kalte Herz, the musical Käpt'n Bye-Bye, from which comes the evergreen "Nimm' mich mit, Kapitän, auf die Reise" ("Take me travelling, Captain"), as well as numerous films, such as The Immenhof Girls (1955).

Pseudonyms used by Schultze include Frank Norbert, Peter Kornfeld, and Henri Iversen.

== Life ==
Schultze took the Abitur in Brunswick and went on to study piano, conducting, composing and theatre science in Cologne and Munich. He went to the Bavarian capital in the 1930s as a composer and worked under the name Frank Norbert as an actor in a student cabaret "Die Vier Nachrichter" ("The Four Reporters"). This was followed by 1932-34 involvement in Heidelberg and as a conductor in Darmstadt, Munich and Leipzig and Mannheim.

== The Third Reich ==
After several projects as production manager at Telefunken, Schultze decided in 1936 to try his luck as a freelance composer for stage and film. He delivered a series of compositions for martial and propaganda songs and was advised to become a member of the National Socialist German Workers Party in 1940 in order not to be conscripted. In 1932 he married his first wife, the actress Vera Spohr, with whom he had four children. After his divorce in 1943 he married the Bulgarian actress, singer and writer Iwa Wanja, who contributed libretti to several of his stage works. They had two sons, one of whom was musician Kristian Schultze.

On behalf of Propaganda Minister Joseph Goebbels he created works such as "From Finland to the Black Sea", "The song of the Kleist tank group", "Tanks roll in Africa" and "Bombs on England".

The popularity of these combat and soldier songs led Norbert Schultze to be continually in demand by National Socialist propaganda. He also wrote music for Veit Harlan's morale-boosting "Hold out" film Kolberg, and the main theme of the war documentary Baptism of Fire (Feuertaufe). His subsequent comment regarding his war work was, "You know, I was at the best age for a soldier, 30 or so. For me the alternatives were: compose or croak. So I decided for the former."

Especially his song "Bomben auf Engeland" led to him being nicknamed "Bomben-Schultze" within Germany's writers of popular tunes in the war years.

In a German language BBC documentary about artists working with Joseph Goebbels he claimed: "after writing the tune for national culture bombs on England I said to myself: Oh my God, what if the air-defence hits my relatives or friends. So naive I was."

== Lili Marleen ==
Schultze wrote the melody to "Lili Marleen" from the poem "Die kleine Hafenorgel" by Hans Leip. In 1990 he told BBC researcher Karen Liebreich that the tune was originally written for a toothpaste radio commercial. Sound recordings, first with a female singer Lale Andersen in 1939 at first sold little, but when the German military transmitter in Belgrade signed off with a recording from the singer several times, listeners' letters showed lively demand. The song met the inner mood of millions of soldiers of all armies who were fighting on both sides of the fronts and was translated into about fifty languages to become one of the global cultural "index fossils" of the Second World War. It was the first German million-seller.

== Post-war period ==
Schultze's Nazi notoriety was such that during the Allied occupation of Germany, all four powers jointly blacklisted him from working again. Schultze was nonetheless defined under denazification as a "fellow traveller", and on payment of a "processing fee" of 3,000 DM received an immediate work permit. His songs being controlled to this day by GEMA (Germany), Schultze ordered that all of his royalties from 1933 to 1945 go to the German Red Cross as is the case to this day.

Schultze remained true to his profession and wrote numerous operas, operettas (such as Rain in Paris), musicals, ballets (Struwwelpeter written pre-war during his time at Telefunken) and Max and Moritz (filmed 1956), music for more than 50 movies, and songs.

He was from 1961 president of the Association of German Playwrights and Composers and from 1973 to 1991 was a board member of the German Composer Association. Until 1996, he held offices on the board of GEMA, the Board of Trustees of the Social Welfare Fund of GEMA and the supply Foundation of the German composers. His later life was spent with his third wife Brigitt Salvatori (married Easter 1992, in a ceremony performed by his daughter), mainly in Majorca but also often in Bavaria.

He died on 14 October 2002 at the age of 91.

== Publications ==
- Mit dir, Lili Marleen. 1995 ISBN 3-254-00206-7

== Selected filmography ==
- Renate in the Quartet (1939)
- Battle Squadron Lützow (1941)
- The Roedern Affair (1944)
- Night of the Twelve (1949)
- Twelve Hearts for Charly (1949)
- A Day Will Come (1950)
- The Day Before the Wedding (1952)
- Captain Bay-Bay (1953)
- The Dancing Heart (1953)
- Beloved Life (1953)
- Captain Wronski (1954)
- A Life for Do (1954)
- Mamitschka (1955)
- The Immenhof Girls (1955)
- Like Once Lili Marleen (1956)
