= Radio Belgrade 202 =

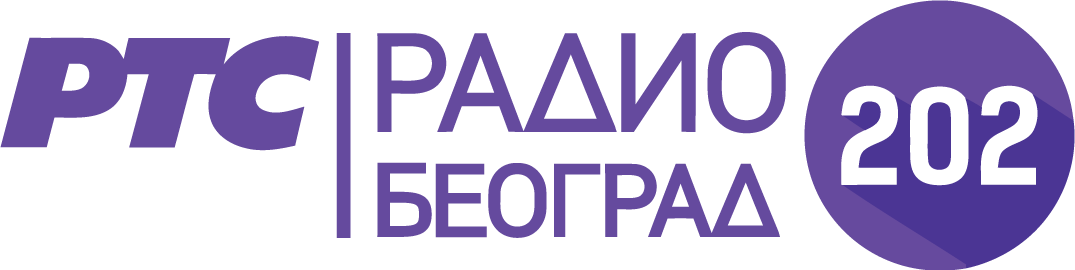

Belgrade, Serbia; Serbia
- Broadcast area: Serbia
- Frequency: 104.4 MHz
- Branding: News & Information

Programming
- Format: News and information

Ownership
- Owner: Radio Belgrade, a division of Radio Television of Serbia

History
- First air date: June 27, 1969

Technical information
- Transmitter coordinates: 43.5514638°N 21.6702472°E

Links
- Webcast: Listen Live
- Website: www.radiobeograd.rs

Radio Belgrade 202 (Serbian: Радио Београд, Radio Beograd) is the fourth program of a state-owned and -operated radio station Radio Belgrade in Belgrade, Serbia.

== History ==
The program of Radio Belgrade 202 began broadcasting on June 27, 1969. Conceived as a city station, in the beginning, the signal could be heard only in the area of Belgrade, broadcasting music and short informational programs. The program was created as an addition to the previous radio offering, which consisted of the First, Second and Third programs of Radio Belgrade. The first host was Hanija Gaković, and the music editor was Darinka Ristović. Initially, the station broadcast for 18 hours a day, and on May 1, 1987, the broadcast of all-day programming began, with improved coverage the entire territory of Serbia.
