= Hans Leip =

German writer

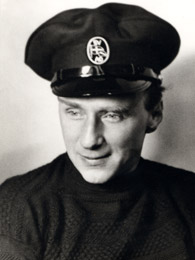
- Hans Leip in uniform
- Born: Hans Leip; 22 September 1893; Hamburg, German Empire
- Died: June 6, 1983 (aged 89); Fruthwilen, Switzerland

Hans Leip (22 September 1893 – 6 June 1983) was a German soldier, novelist, poet and playwright, best remembered as the lyricist of Lili Marleen.

Leip was the son of a former sailor and harbour-worker at the port of Hamburg. He was educated there, and in 1914 became a teacher in the Hamburg suburb of Rothenburgsort. In 1915 he was called up by the German Army and after training in Berlin served on the Eastern Front and in the Carpathians. After being wounded in 1917 he was discharged on medical grounds.

He first had ambitions as an artist, but then turned to writing, although he illustrated his books himself. In the 1920s, he travelled extensively, to Paris, London, Algiers and New York City, among other places. His breakthrough as a novelist was with the success of Godekes Knecht, which was awarded the prize of the Kölnische Zeitung newspaper. His novels sold well in the years leading up to the outbreak of World War II, while he also wrote plays, short stories, poems, dramas and was also a painter and sculptor.

== "Lili Marleen" ==
Leip wrote the words while serving in the army during World War I. The poem was originally titled "Das Mädchen unter der Laterne" (German for "The Girl under the Lantern"). He reportedly combined the nickname of his girlfriend with that of a nurse. The poem was later published as "Das Lied eines jungen Soldaten auf der Wacht" ("The Song of a Young Soldier on Watch") in 1937, now with the two last (of five) verses added by Leip. It was set to music by Norbert Schultze in 1938. Tommie Connor later wrote English lyrics. It was recorded by Lale Andersen in 1939 and subsequently, in many translations, became a worldwide hit.

== Bibliography ==
- Godekes Knecht (1925)
- Herz im Wind (1934)
- Jan Klimp (1934)
- Das Heitere Taschenbuch (1953)
- Hamburg: Portrait of a City (1955)
- Die Klabauter Flagge (1956)
- Der Gross Floss Im Meer (1957)
- Die Sonnenflüte (1958)
- Bordbuch Des Satan (1959)
- Die Bergung (1963)
- Sukiya (1965)
- Aber die Liebe (1969)
- Das Mufchelhorn (1970)
- Das Tanzrad (1979)

== Stamp ==
In 1993, one hundred years after his birth, Germany issued a stamp in his honor. The stamp used an engraving that Hans Leip created, that he called "Tuledu Bridge".
