= Axis occupation of Serbia =

1941–1944 military presence of the Axis in Serbia

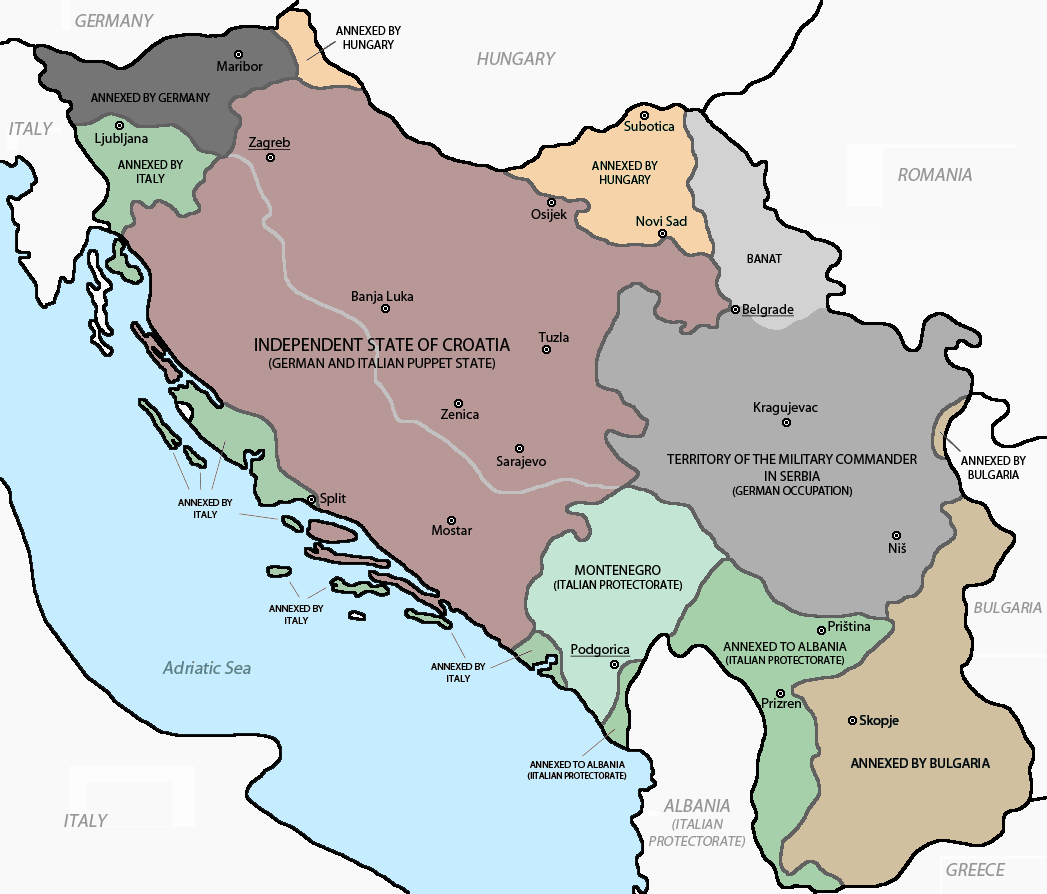
Axis occupation and partition of Yugoslavia (1941)

During World War II, several provinces of the Kingdom of Yugoslavia corresponding to the modern-day state of Serbia were occupied by the Axis powers from 1941 to 1944. Most of the area was occupied by the Wehrmacht and was organized as separate territory under control of the German Military Administration in Serbia. Other parts of modern Serbia that were not included in the Nazi German-administered territory were occupied and annexed by neighboring Axis countries: Syrmia was occupied and annexed by the Independent State of Croatia, Bačka was occupied and annexed by Hungary, southeastern Serbia was occupied and annexed by Bulgaria, and southwestern Serbia was occupied and annexed by Italy and included in the Italian protectorates of Albania and Montenegro.

== German occupation ==
The area under control of the German Military Administration in Serbia was initially occupied by the Germans. It was later occupied mostly by Bulgarian troops, but remained under German military authority. On stamps and coins this territory was referred to as Serbia, and, according the historian Paul N. Hehn, its official name was the Territory of the Military Commander in Serbia. This territory had two successive Serbian puppet governments under the control of the German military authorities. The first, short-lived, puppet government was known as the Commissioner Government and was led by Milan Aćimović. The second puppet government was known as the Government of National Salvation and was led by Milan Nedić.

During the occupation, the Germans set up Soldatensender Belgrad, the popular radio station for German soldiers across Europe and Africa.

Approximately 11,000 of the Jewish population of about 12,500 in German-occupied Serbia were killed

== Italian–Albanian occupation ==
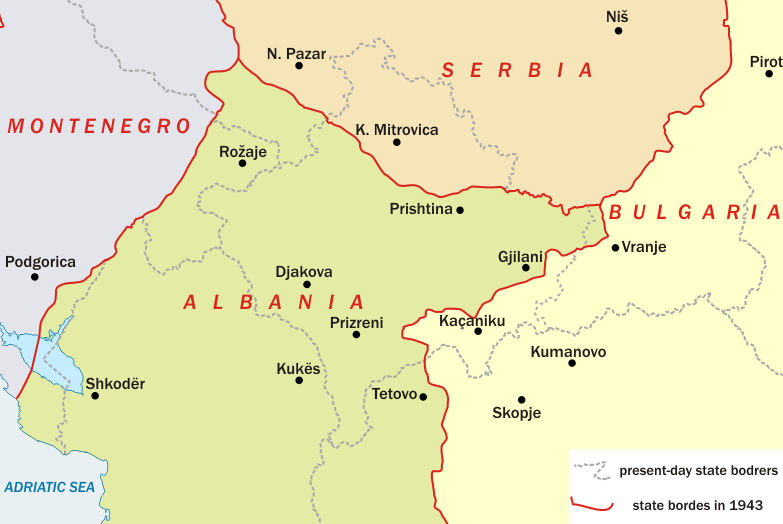
Italian occupation of Metohija and central parts of Kosovo (1941-1943)

The line between the German-occupied area and the Italian Albania in the Kosovo region was the cause of a significant clash of interests, mainly due to the important lead and zinc mines at Trepča and the key railway line from Kosovska Mitrovica through Pristina–Uroševac–Kačanik to Skopje. Ultimately the Germans prevailed, with the "Vienna Line" extending from Novi Pazar in the Sandžak through Kosovska Mitrovica and Pristina, along the railway between Pristina and Uroševac and then towards Tetovo in modern-day North Macedonia before turning northeast to meet Bulgarian-annexed territory near Orlova Čuka. The Kosovska Mitrovica, Vučitrn and Lab districts, along with part of the Gračanica district, to were all part of the German-occupied territory. This territory contained a number of other important mines, including the lead mine at Belo Brdo, an asbestos mine near Jagnjenica and a magnesite mine at Dubovac near Vučitrn.

The Sandžak region was initially divided between the Germans in the north and the Italians in the south using an extension of the so-called "Vienna Line" which divided Yugoslavia into German and Italian zones of influence. The border of the occupied territory through the Sandžak was modified several times in quick succession during April and May 1941, eventually settling on the general line of Priboj–Nova Varoš–Sjenica–Novi Pazar, although the towns of Rudo, Priboj, Nova Varoš, Sjenica and Duga Poljana were on the Italian-occupied Montenegrin side of the border. The NDH government was unhappy with these arrangements, as they wanted to annex the Sandžak to the NDH and considered it would be easier for them to achieve this if the Germans occupied a larger portion of the region.

== Hungarian occupation ==
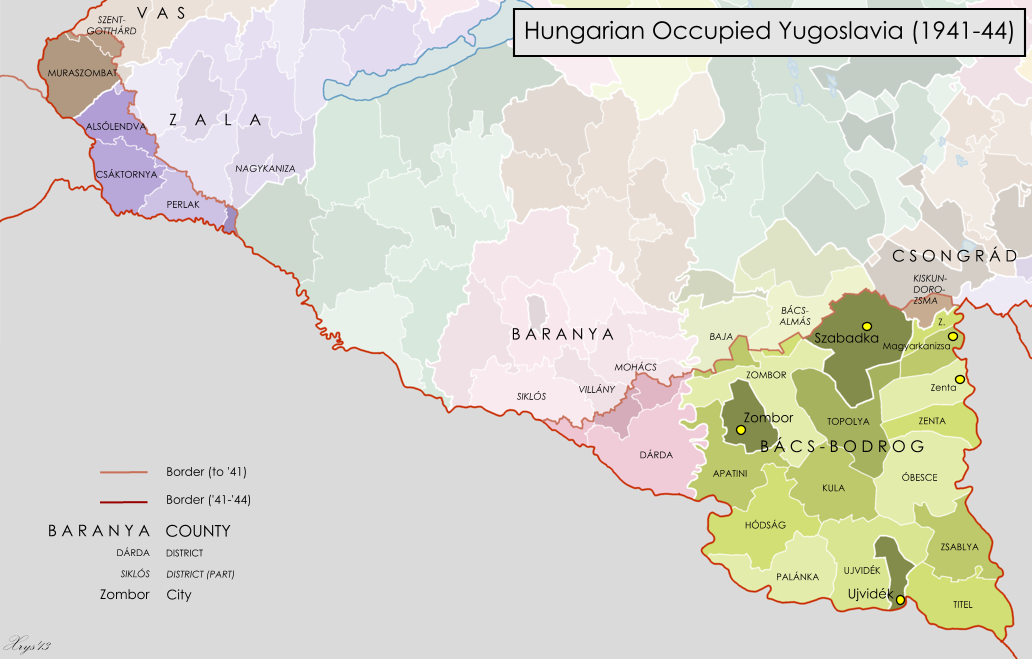
Hungarian occupation of Yugoslav territories (1941-1944)

After discussions with both the Romanian and Hungarian governments, Adolf Hitler decided that the Bačka and Banat region would be divided by the river Tisa, with the eastern portion under German occupation along with "Old Serbia". The portion west of the Tisa was occupied and annexed by Hungary. The Romanian-Hungarian rivalry was not the only reason for retaining the Banat under German occupation, as it also contained some 120,000 ethnic Germans (or Volksdeutsche) and was a valuable economic region. In addition to the Tisa, the other borders of the Banat were the Danube to the south, and the post-World War I Yugoslav-Romanian and Yugoslav-Hungarian borders in the north and east.

== Croatian occupation ==
Much of the western border between the occupied territory with the NDH had been approved by the Germans and announced by Ante Pavelic on 7 June 1941. However, the approved border only followed the Drina downstream as far as Bajina Bašta, and beyond this point the border had not been finalised. On 5 July 1941 this border was fixed as continuing to follow the Drina until the confluence with the Brusnica tributary east of the village of Zemlica, then east of the Drina following the pre-World War I Bosnia and Herzegovina-Serbia border.

An area of eastern Syrmia was initially included in the occupied territory for military and economic reasons, especially given Belgrade's airport and radio station were located there. The number of Volksdeutsche living in the area along with its role in providing food for Belgrade were also factors in the original decision. During this early period the border between the occupied territory and the NDH ran between the villages of Slankamen on the Danube and Boljevci on the Sava. However, after pressure from the NDH, supported by the German ambassador to Zagreb, Siegfried Kasche, it was gradually fully transferred to NDH control with the approval of the Military Commander in Serbia, and became a formal part of the NDH on 10 October 1941. The local Volksdeutsche asked for the area to be returned to German control, but this did not occur. As a result of the transfer of this region, the borders of the NDH reached the outskirts of Belgrade.

== Bulgarian occupation ==
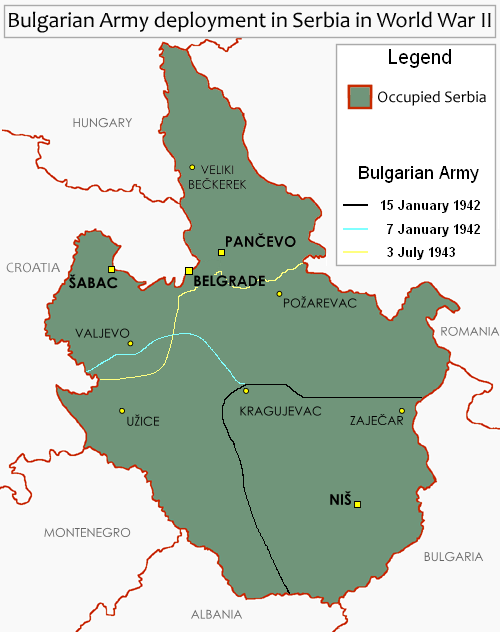
Bulgarian Army occupation zones in Nedic's Serbia during World War II.

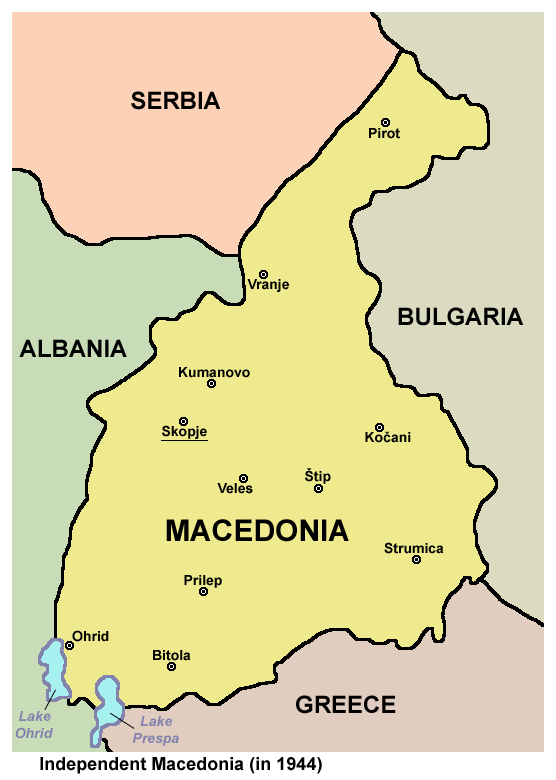
Regions of Yugoslavia annexed by Bulgaria (1941–1944)

In 1941 some parts of Serbia, including Vranje, Bosilegrad, Caribrod and Pirot were occupied and subsequently annexed by Bulgaria. Later, between 1942 and 1943, other significant parts of Serbia, were occupied by Bulgaria, but left under German supervision.

In January 1942, to secure the railroads, highways and other infrastructure, the Germans began to make use of Bulgarian occupation troops in large areas of the occupied territory, although these troops were under German command and control. This occurred in three phases, with the Bulgarian 1st Occupation Corps consisting of three divisions moving into the occupied territory on 31 December 1941. This corps was initially responsible for about 40% of the territory (excluding the Banat), bounded by the Ibar river in the west between Kosovska Mitrovica and Kraljevo, the West Morava river between Kraljevo and Čačak, and then a line running roughly east from Čačak through Kragujevac to the border with Bulgaria. They were therefore responsible for large sections of the Belgrade–Niš–Sofia and Niš–Skopje railway lines, as well as the main Belgrade–Niš–Skopje highway.

In January 1943, the Bulgarian area was expanded westwards to include all areas west of the Ibar river and south of a line running roughly west from Čačak to the border with occupied Montenegro and the NDH. This released the 7th SS Volunteer Mountain Division Prinz Eugen, which had been garrisoning this area over the winter, to deploy into the NDH and take part in Case White against the Partisans. Many members of the Volksdeutsche from Serbia and the Banat were serving in the 7th SS Volunteer Mountain Division Prinz Eugen. This division was responsible for war crimes committed against the peoples of Bosnia and Herzegovina.

In July 1943, the Bulgarian occupation zone expanded northwards, with a fourth division, the 25th Division taking over from the 297th Infantry Division in the rest of the territory (excluding the Banat) that did not share a border with the NDH. From this point, German forces only directly occupied the immediate area of Belgrade, the northwest region of the territory that shared a border with the NDH, and the Banat.

== Bibliography ==
- Ćirković, Sima (2004). The Serbs. Malden: Blackwell Publishing. ISBN 9781405142915.
- Hehn, Paul N. (1971). "Serbia, Croatia and Germany 1941-1945: Civil War and Revolution in the Balkans". Canadian Slavonic Papers. 13 (4). University of Alberta: 344–373. doi:10.1080/00085006.1971.11091249.
- Janjetović, Zoran (2012). "Borders of the German occupation zone in Serbia 1941–1944" (PDF). Journal of the Geographical Institute Jovan Cvijic. 62 (2). Serbian Academy of Sciences and Arts: 93–115. doi:10.2298/IJGI1202093J.
- Kulić, Dimitrije (1993). Bugarska okupacija Srbije, 1941-1944 [Bulgarian occupation of Serbia, 1941—1944] (in Serbian). Belgrade: Justicija. ISBN 9788682065029. OCLC 39679387.
- Mitrovski, Boro; Glišić, Venceslav; Ristovski, Tomo (1971). Bugarska vojska u Jugoslaviji 1941–1945 [The Bulgarian Army in Yugoslavia 1941–1945] (in Slovenian). Međunarodna politika.
- Lemkin, Raphael (2008). Axis Rule in Occupied Europe: Laws of Occupation, Analysis of Government, Proposals for Redress. Introductions by Samantha Power and William A. Schabas (2nd ed.). Clarke, New Jersey: The Lawbook Exchange, Ltd. pp. 241–264. ISBN 978-1-58477-901-8.
- Lumans, Valdis O. (1993). Himmler's Auxiliaries: The Volksdeutsche Mittelstelle and the German National Minorities of Europe, 1933–1945. Chapel Hill: University of North Carolina Press. ISBN 978-0-8078-2066-7.
- Margolian, Howard (2000). Unauthorized Entry: The Truth about Nazi War Criminals in Canada, 1946–1956. Toronto: University of Toronto Press.
- Pavlowitch, Stevan K. (1985). Unconventional Perceptions of Yugoslavia 1940–1945. New York: Columbia University Press. ISBN 9780880330817.
- Pavlowitch, Stevan K. (2002). Serbia: The History behind the Name. London: Hurst & Company. ISBN 9781850654773.
- Pavlowitch, Stevan K. (2008). Hitler's New Disorder: The Second World War in Yugoslavia. New York: Columbia University Press. ISBN 9780231700504.
- Stojiljković, Miroslav (1989). Bugarska okupatorska politika u Srbiji : 1941-1944 [Bulgarian occupation policy in Serbia:1941—1944] (in Serbian). Belgrade: ISI. ISBN 9788674030233. OCLC 444185826.
- Stambolić, Slobodan (1953). "Okupacija Srbije 1941 [The occupation of Serbia in 1941]". Vojno Istorijski Glasnik (in Serbian). Vol. IV. Belgrade: Vojnoistorijski institut. pp. 49–67. OCLC 243425265.
- Thomas, Nigel; Mikulan, Krunoslav (1995). Axis Forces in Yugoslavia 1941–45. Men-at-Arms. Vol. 282. Illustrated by Darko Pavlovic. London: Osprey. ISBN 1-85532-473-3. Archived from the original on 2014-12-29.
- Tomasevich, Jozo (1975). War and Revolution in Yugoslavia, 1941-1945: The Chetniks. Vol. 1. Stanford: Stanford University Press. ISBN 9780804708579.
- Tomasevich, Jozo (2001). War and Revolution in Yugoslavia, 1941-1945: Occupation and Collaboration. Vol. 2. Stanford: Stanford University Press. ISBN 9780804779241.
