= D-Day Dodgers =

Song
- Written: November 1944
- Genre: War song
- Songwriter: Harry Pynn

The D-Day Dodgers were Allied servicemen who fought in Italy during the Second World War. The D-Day Dodgers also inspired a popular wartime soldier's song (Roud Folk Song Index no. 10499).

A rumour spread during the war that the term was publicized by Viscountess Astor, a Member of the British Parliament, who supposedly used the expression in public after a disillusioned serviceman in Italy signed a letter to her as being from a "D-Day Dodger". However, there is no record that she actually said this, in or out of Parliament, and she herself denied ever saying it.

Reference to a "D-Day Dodger" was bitingly sarcastic, given the steady stream of Allied service personnel who were being killed or wounded in combat on the Italian front. A "dodger" is someone who avoids something; the soldiers in Italy felt that their sacrifices were being ignored after the invasion of Normandy, and a "D-Day Dodger" was a reference to someone who was supposedly avoiding real combat by serving in Italy, whereas the reality was anything but – as the numerous allied war cemeteries in locations such as Monte Cassino testify.

== The Ballad of the D-Day Dodgers ==
Several versions of a song called "D-Day Dodgers", set to the tune "Lili Marleen" (a favourite song of all troops in the North African Campaign – the British Eighth Army was a veteran formation from that theatre before landing in Italy), were sung with gusto in the last months of the war, and at post-war reunions.

The song was written in November 1944 by Lance-Sergeant Harry Pynn of the Tank Rescue Section, 19 Army Fire Brigade, who was with the 78th Infantry Division just south of Bologna, Italy. There were many variations on verses and even the chorus, but the song generally and sarcastically referred to how easy their life in Italy was. There was no mention of Lady Astor in the original lyrics. Many Allied personnel in Italy had reason to be bitter, as the bulk of material support for the Allied armies went to Northwest Europe after the invasion of Normandy. They also noted sardonically that they had participated in several "D-days" of their own before the landings in Normandy became popularly known as "D-Day". The British Army always goes into action at H-Hour on D-Day, but the popular press turned it into an expression synonymous with the Normandy landings only. Italian campaign veterans noted that they had been in action for eleven months before the Normandy landings, and some of those had served in North Africa even before that.

The numerous Commonwealth War Graves Commission cemeteries across Italy are compelling evidence of the fighting which took place during campaigns such as Operation Avalanche and the subsequent Battle of Monte Cassino.

Although Hamish Henderson did not write the song, he did collect different versions of it and it is attributed to him in the sleeve notes of the Ian Campbell Folk Group's "Contemporary Campbells". Many different variations have been recorded.

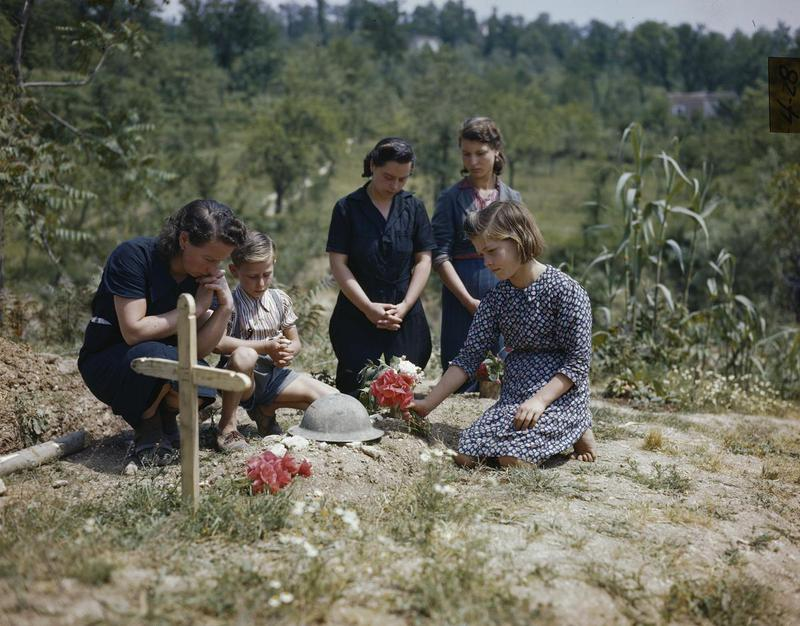
A family places flowers on the grave of a British soldier killed in the Battle of Monte Cassino

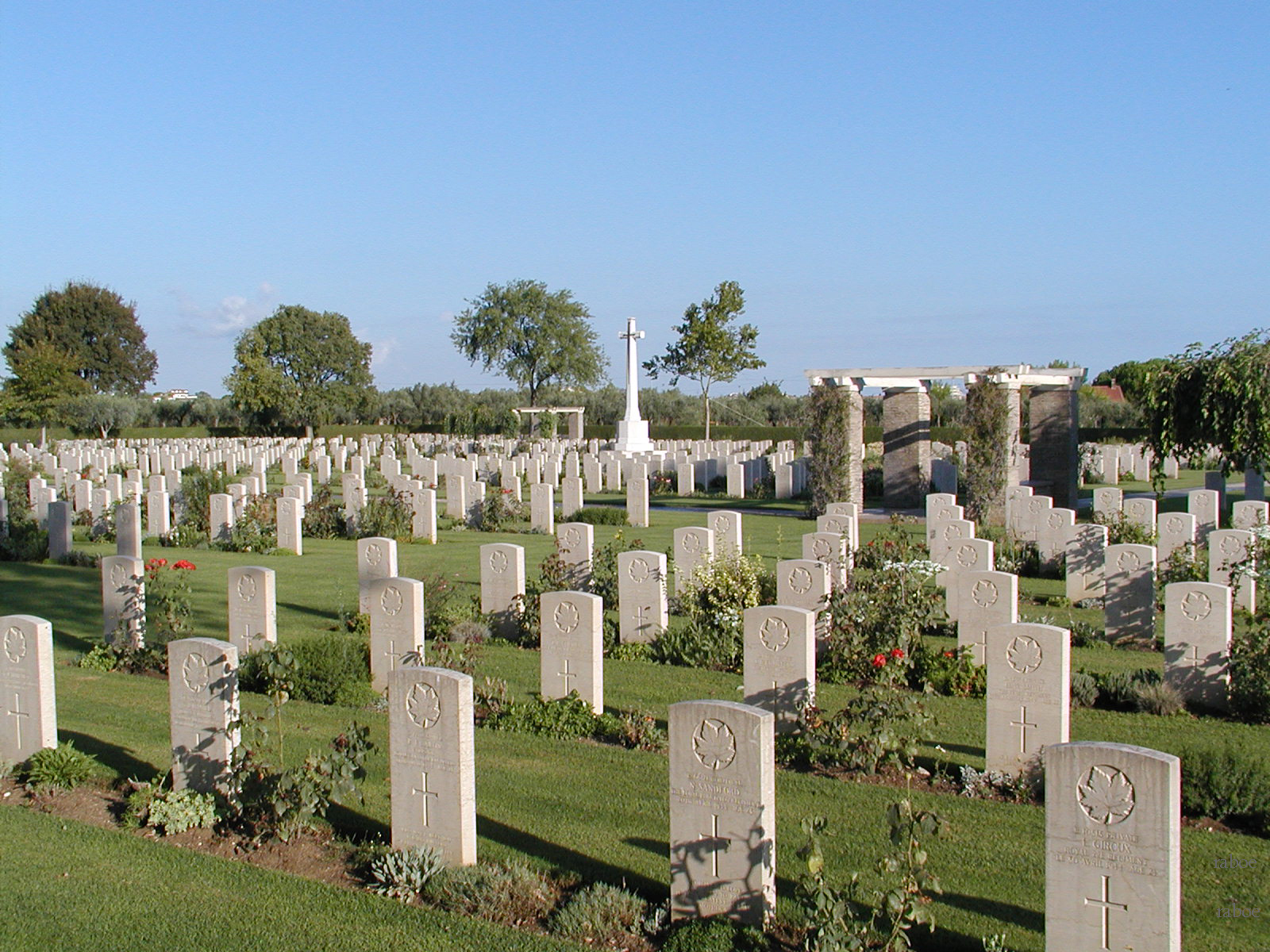
CWGC cemetery at Ortona

We're the D-Day Dodgers out in Italy
Always on the vino, always on the spree.
Eighth Army scroungers and their tanks
We live in Rome – among the Yanks.
We are the D-Day Dodgers, over here in Italy.

We landed at Salerno, a holiday with pay,
Jerry brought the band down to greet us on our way
Showed us the sights and gave us tea,
We all sang songs, the beer was free.
We are the D-Day Dodgers, way out in Italy.

The Volturno and Cassino were taken in our stride.
We didn't have to fight there. We just went for the ride.
Anzio and Sangro were all forlorn.
We did not do a thing from dusk to dawn.
For we are the D-Day Dodgers, over here in Italy.

On our way to Florence we had a lovely time.
We ran a bus to Rimini right through the Gothic Line.
On to Bologna we did go.
Then we went bathing in the Po.
For we are the D-Day Dodgers, over here in Italy.

Once we had a blue light that we were going home
Back to dear old Blighty, never more to roam.
Then somebody said in France you'll fight.
We said fuck that, we'll just sit tight,
The windy D-Day Dodgers, out in Sunny Italy.

Now Lady Astor, get a load of this.
Don't stand up on a platform and talk a load of piss.
You're the nation's sweetheart, the nation's pride
We think your mouth's too bloody wide.
We are the D-Day Dodgers, in Sunny Italy.

When you look 'round the mountains, through the mud and rain
You'll find the crosses, some which bear no name.
Heartbreak, and toil and suffering gone
The boys beneath them slumber on
They were the D-Day Dodgers, who'll stay in Italy.

So listen all you people, over land and foam
Even though we've parted, our hearts are close to home.
When we return we hope you'll say
"You did your little bit, though far away
All of the D-Day Dodgers, way out there in Italy."

=== Recordings ===
- Pete Seeger on The Complete Bowdoin College Concert 1960 (recorded 1960; released 2011); and on Kisses Sweeter Than Wine (1996)
- Ian Campbell Folk Group on Contemporary Campbells (1965)
- The Clancy Brothers and Tommy Makem on Home Boys Home (1968)
- The Leesiders (UK folk duo) on The Leesiders (1968)
- The Spinners (UK folk band) on By Arrangement (1973)
- The Yetties on Argo LP "Up in Arms" (1974) track listed as "Lili Marlele"
- Hamish Imlach on A Man's A Man (Autogram ALLP 215), (1978)
- Ian Robb on From Different Angels (1994)
- Kathy Hampson's Free Elastic Band (est. 1990s)
- The Houghton Weavers on Songs of Conflict (2012)
- Johnny Collins on Johnny's Private Army (Tradition TSR020, 1975)

== Literature ==
Several books have used the term "D-Day Dodgers" in their titles.

- Dancocks, Daniel G. (1991). D-Day Dodgers: the Canadians in Italy 1943–45. Toronto: McClelland and Stewart. ISBN 0771025432.: sketches the history of Canadian military participation in the Italian Campaign.
- War Story D-Day Dodgers by Garth Ennis and John Higgins. A graphic novel published in 2001 by Vertigo DC Comics. It contains a version of the song.
- Holman, James (2008). D-Day Dodger: Memories of a Canadian Foot Soldier in Italy. ISBN 1897518900. An account of a soldier's experience during the Italian campaign.

== See also ==
- List of anti-war songs
- Fourteenth Army (United Kingdom), known as the "Forgotten Army"
