= Artur Beul =

Artur Beul (December 9, 1915 in Einsiedeln, Switzerland – January 9, 2010 in Küsnacht) was a Swiss songwriter. He was married from 1949 until her death in 1972 to the German singer Lale Andersen, best known for her interpretation of the song Lili Marleen.

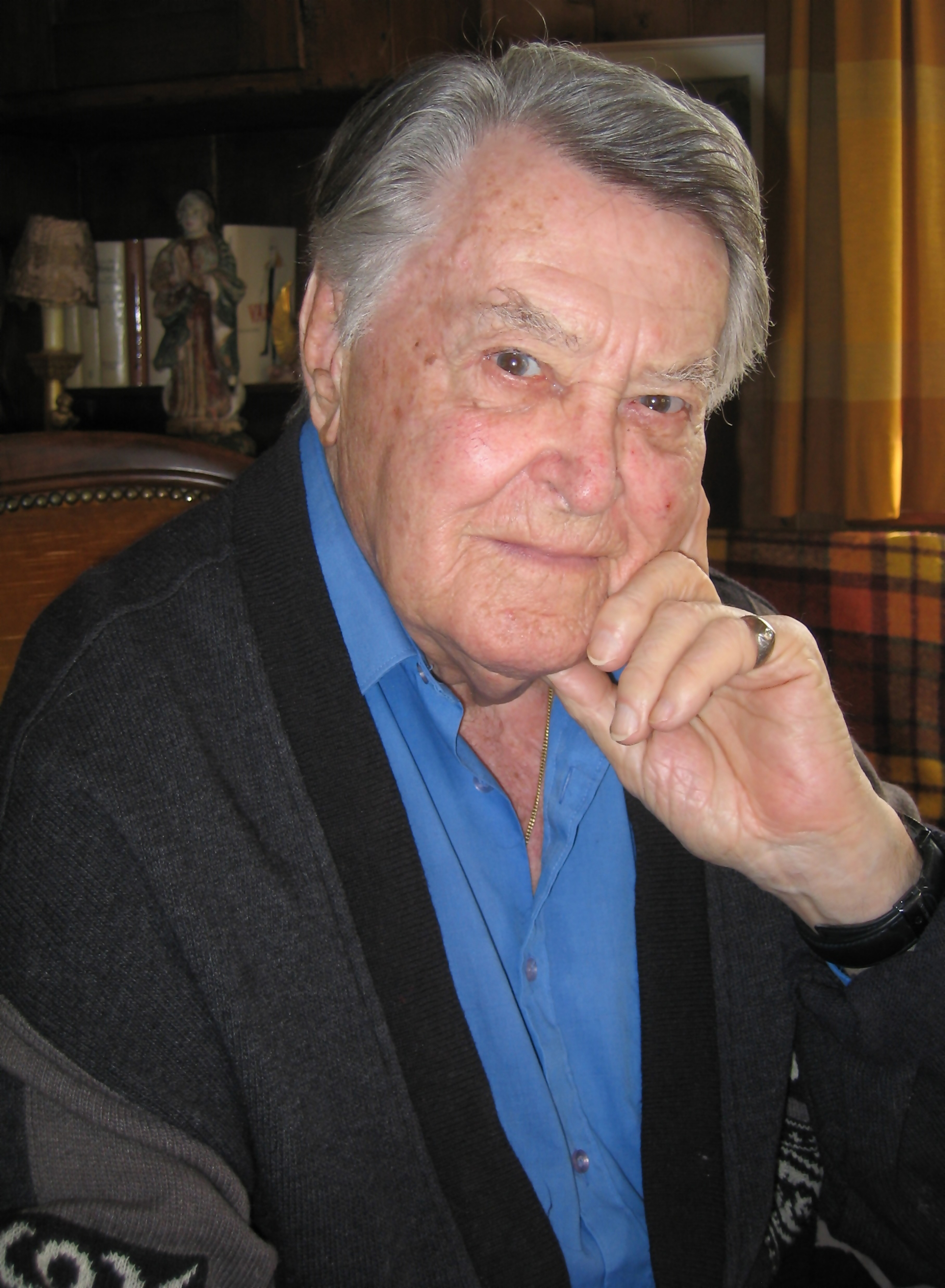
Artur Beul 2007

== Discography ==
- 20 Goldene Erinnerungen an Artur Beul (Twenty Golden Memories of Artur Beul) on the Turicaphon label
- Artur Beul spielt Klavier (Artur Beul Plays Piano) on the Phonodisc label

== Awards ==
- 1985: Gold Record for 50'000 recordings sold
- 1995: Prix Walo for his life's work.
- 2007: On 14 September 2007, Artur Beul was awarded the Golden Medal of Honour of the Canton of Zurich by the Bernhard-Theater Zürich, in recognition of his services to the art of music.

== Bibliography ==
- Artur Beul (1994) Nach Regen scheint Sonne (After Rain Comes Sunshine), Edition Swiss Music, Winterthur, CH
- Adrian Michael (1995) Zolliker Jahrheft 1995 (Zolliker Yearbook 1995) - detailed curriculum vitae
