= Paul N. Hehn =

American historian (1927–2015)

Paul N. Hehn (8 April 1927 – 4 January 2015) was an American historian who specialized in the Second World War. The son of a German immigrant father and a French-Canadian mother, Hehn was born in Manhattan and served as a US Navy Seabee in the South Pacific and Japan in 1945 and 1946. He received his BA from the University of Oregon in 1950 and his MA from Columbia University in 1954.

Two years later, he traveled to West Germany for a year of study at the Ludwig-Maximilians-Universität München; after this, he spent a year conducting archival research in Yugoslavia. Returning to the United States, he earned his doctorate in history from New York University in 1961. For a number of years afterward, he taught at various institutions of higher education in Ohio and at Temple University.

In 1968, Hehn was hired by the State University of New York, College at Brockport, where he was a member of the Department of History for the next 22 years. While at Brockport, he was known as a teacher and mentor who challenged students to think critically and who paid attention to their personal interests and needs.

After retiring in 1990 as professor emeritus of history, he intensified his research and writing on World War II and eastern European history. In 2002, he published his magnum opus titled A Low Dishonest Decade: The Great Powers, Eastern Europe, and the Economic Origins of World War II, 1930–1941. As The Independent Review: A Journal of Political Economy wrote, "Hehn contends forthrightly that economic rivalries ... formed the essential and primary cause of World War II. ... Hehn's vast research apparatus (100 pages of footnotes and bibliography), would be humbling for many historians." Publishers Weekly found that "Hehn's imperialist theme is compelling" and "powerfully argued".

The title A Low, Dishonest Decade comes from the poem September 1, 1939 by the British-American poet W. H. Auden:

I sit in one of the dives
On Fifty-second Street
Uncertain and afraid
As the clever hopes expire
Of a low dishonest decade:
Waves of anger and fear
Circulate over the bright
And darkened lands of the earth,
Obsessing our private lives;
The unmentionable odour of death
Offends the September night.

== Publications ==
- The German Struggle against the Yugoslav Guerillas in World War II (Columbia University Press, 1979), ISBN 0914710486
- A Low, Dishonest Decade: The Great Powers, Eastern Europe, and the Economic Origins of World War II, 1930-1941 (Bloomsbury Academic, 2002), ISBN 0826414494
