= Radio Belgrade =

- Type: Public-service sound broadcasting
- Country: Serbia
- Availability: National; international
- Radio stations: Radio Belgrade 1; Radio Belgrade 2; Radio Belgrade 3; Radio Belgrade 202
- Headquarters: Belgrade, Serbia
- Owner: Government of Serbia
- Key people: Milan Nedić, director
- Launch date: 24 March 1929; 97 years ago
- Former names: Radio Belgrade AD
- Official website: www.radiobeograd.rs
- Replaced: Radio Beograd-Rakovica (1924)

Radio Belgrade 1
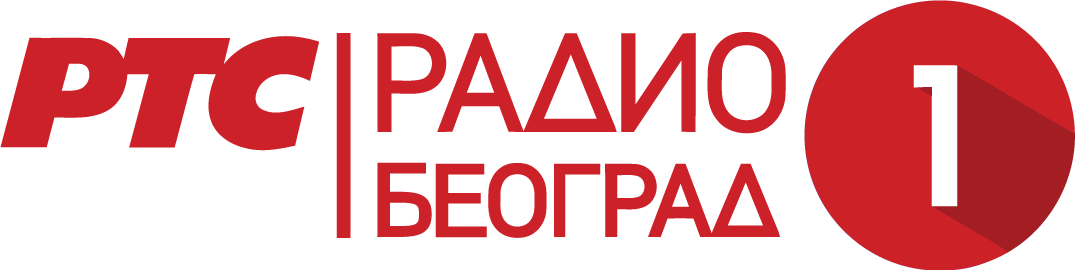
- Belgrade, Serbia; Serbia
- Broadcast area: Serbia
- Frequency: 684 kHz
- Branding: News & Information

Programming
- Format: Public Radio

Ownership
- Owner: Republic of Serbia

History
- First air date: 24 March 1929; 97 years ago

Technical information
- Power: 30 kW
- Transmitter coordinates: 43.5514638°N 21.6702472°E

Links
- Webcast: Listen Live

Radio Belgrade (Serbian: Радио Београд, Radio Beograd) is a state-owned and operated radio station in Belgrade, Serbia. It has four different programs (Radio Belgrade 1, Radio Belgrade 2, Radio Belgrade 3, and Radio Belgrade 202), a precious archive of several hundreds of thousands records, magnetic tapes and CDs, and is part of Radio Television of Serbia.

== History ==
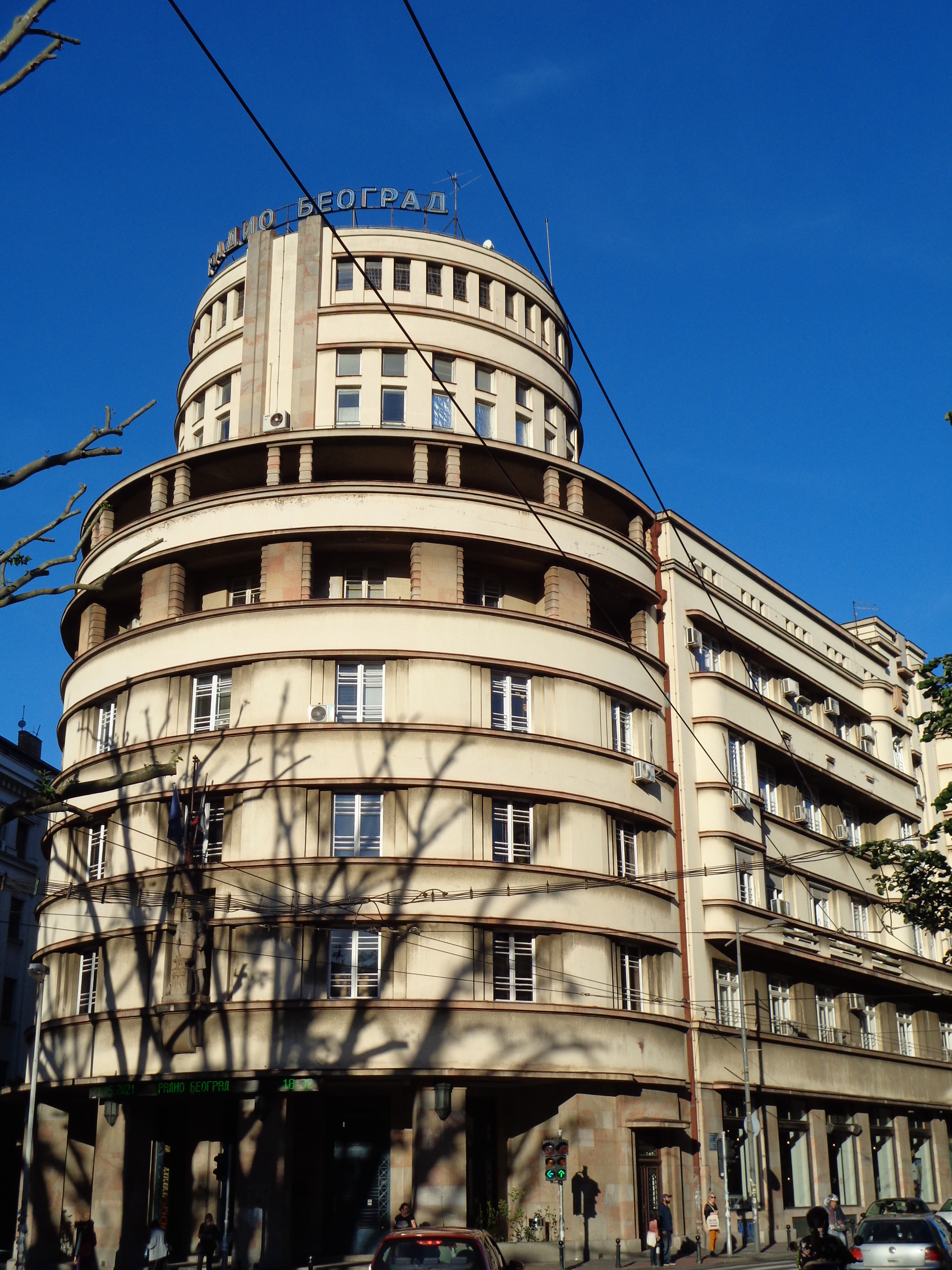
Radio Belgrade headquarters

The predecessor of Radio Beograd, Radio Beograd-Rakovica, started its program in 1924 and was a part of a state wireless telegraph station. Radio Beograd, AD started in March 1929. Its program consists of music, news, radio-drama, broadcasting from theaters, etc.

Radio Beograd stopped broadcasting on April 6, 1941, when bombed during the German air raid of Belgrade, (Operation Punishment). After the occupation of Belgrade, Radio Belgrade became the German forces' radio station under the name of Soldatensender Belgrad (Soldiers Radio Belgrad) on the same frequency. It could be received throughout Europe and the Mediterranean. A lieutenant working at the station who was taking leave in Vienna was asked to collect some records to broadcast. Amongst a pile he obtained from a second hand shop was the little-known two-year-old song Lili Marleen sung by Lale Andersen, which up to then had sold only around 700 copies. Karl-Heinz Reintgen, the German officer in charge of station, began playing the song on the air. Due to their limited collection of records at the time the song was played frequently.

After the Nazi government then ordered it to stop broadcasting the song, Radio Belgrade received many letters from Axis soldiers all over Europe asking them to play Lili Marleen again. In response, Radio Belgrade returned the song to its programming. From then on, the station played Andersen's recording every evening at 9:55 PM and its popularity continued to grow. Soldiers stationed around the Mediterranean, including both German Afrika Korps and British Eighth Army troops, regularly tuned in to hear it. Even Erwin Rommel, the commander of the Afrika Korps admired the song. He asked Radio Belgrade to incorporate the song into their daily broadcasts, which they did. Even Allied soldiers enjoyed listing to it, when the song was taken down. Field Marshal Bernard Montgomery protested along with numerous soldiers of the Eighth Army.

After Josip Broz Tito's Partisans seized power in 1944, a new Radio Belgrade, this time under Communist control, continued its operation and gradually became the most influential broadcast medium in Serbia and the former Yugoslavia.

Nowadays, Radio Beograd is transformed into a public service broadcaster.

== Stations ==
RTS operates four national radio stations, under the name Radio Belgrade. Since 18 September 2019, RTS also operates a number of online thematic stations; these are RTS Pletenica (folk music, ensembles and soloists), RTS Rokenroller (rock and pop music) and RTS Juboks (evergreen music), as well as RTS Vrteška which is intended for children and parents.

== See also ==
- List of radio stations in Serbia
