= Lili Marleen =

German song by Norbert Schultz (text by Hans Leip)

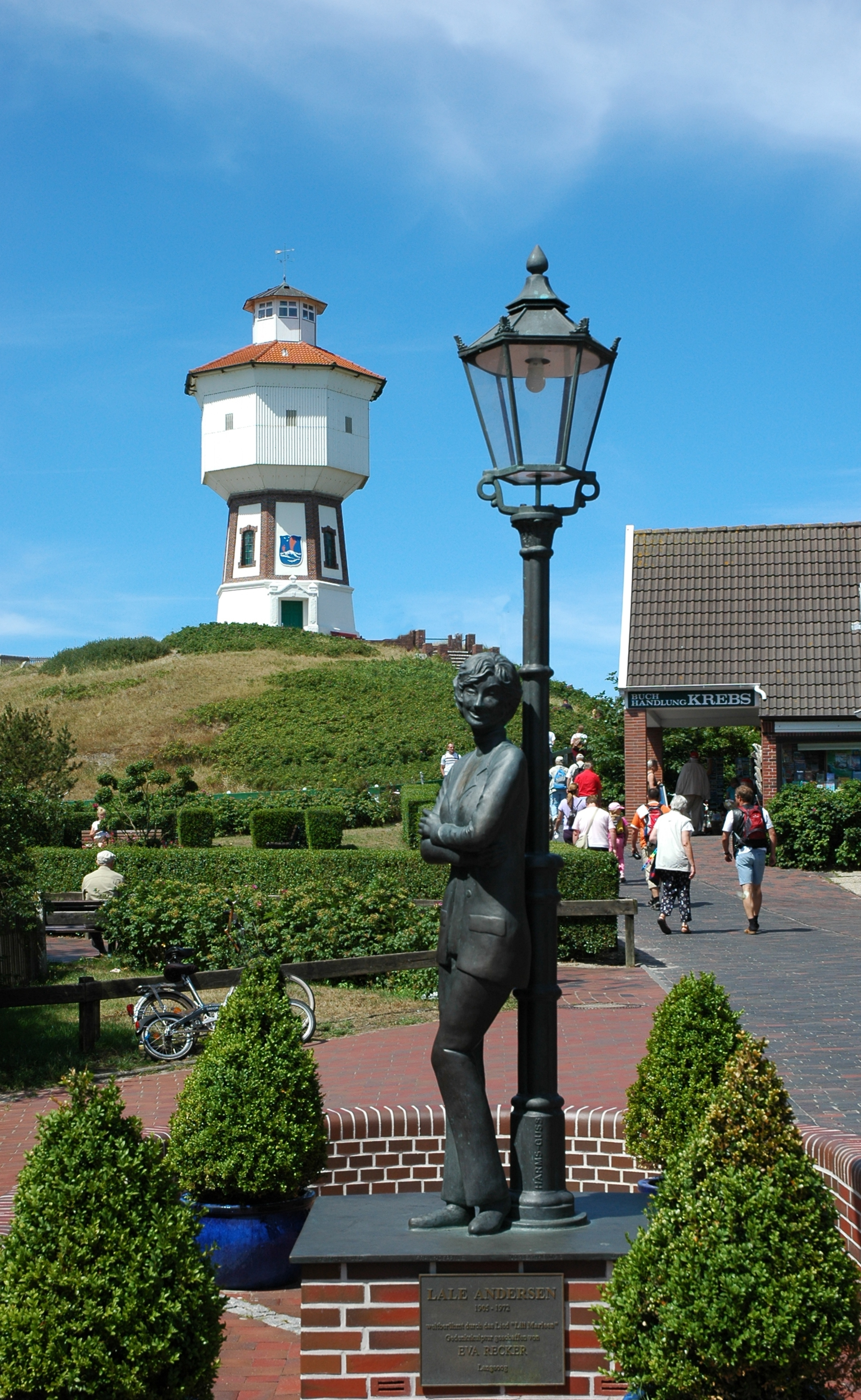
A "Lili Marleen" and Lale Andersen memorial in Langeoog, Germany

"Lili Marleen" (also spelled "Lili Marlen'", "Lilli Marlene", "Lily Marlene", "Lili Marlène" among others; German pronunciation: [ˈlɪliː maʁˈleːn(ə)]) is a German love song that became popular during World War II throughout Europe and the Mediterranean among both Axis and Allied troops after being regularly broadcast by Soldatensender Belgrad, a German military radio station in occupied Belgrade. Written in 1915 as a poem, it was set to music in 1938 and was first recorded by Lale Andersen in 1939 as "Das Mädchen unter der Laterne" ("The Girl under the Lantern"). The song is also well known in a version performed by Marlene Dietrich.

In 2005, Bear Family Records released a 7-CD set Lili Marleen an allen Fronten ("Lili Marleen on all Fronts"), including nearly 200 versions of "Lili Marleen" with a 180-page booklet.

== Creation ==
The True Story of Lili Marlene (1944), a British propaganda film by Humphrey Jennings. Despite its title the film contains multiple inaccuracies.

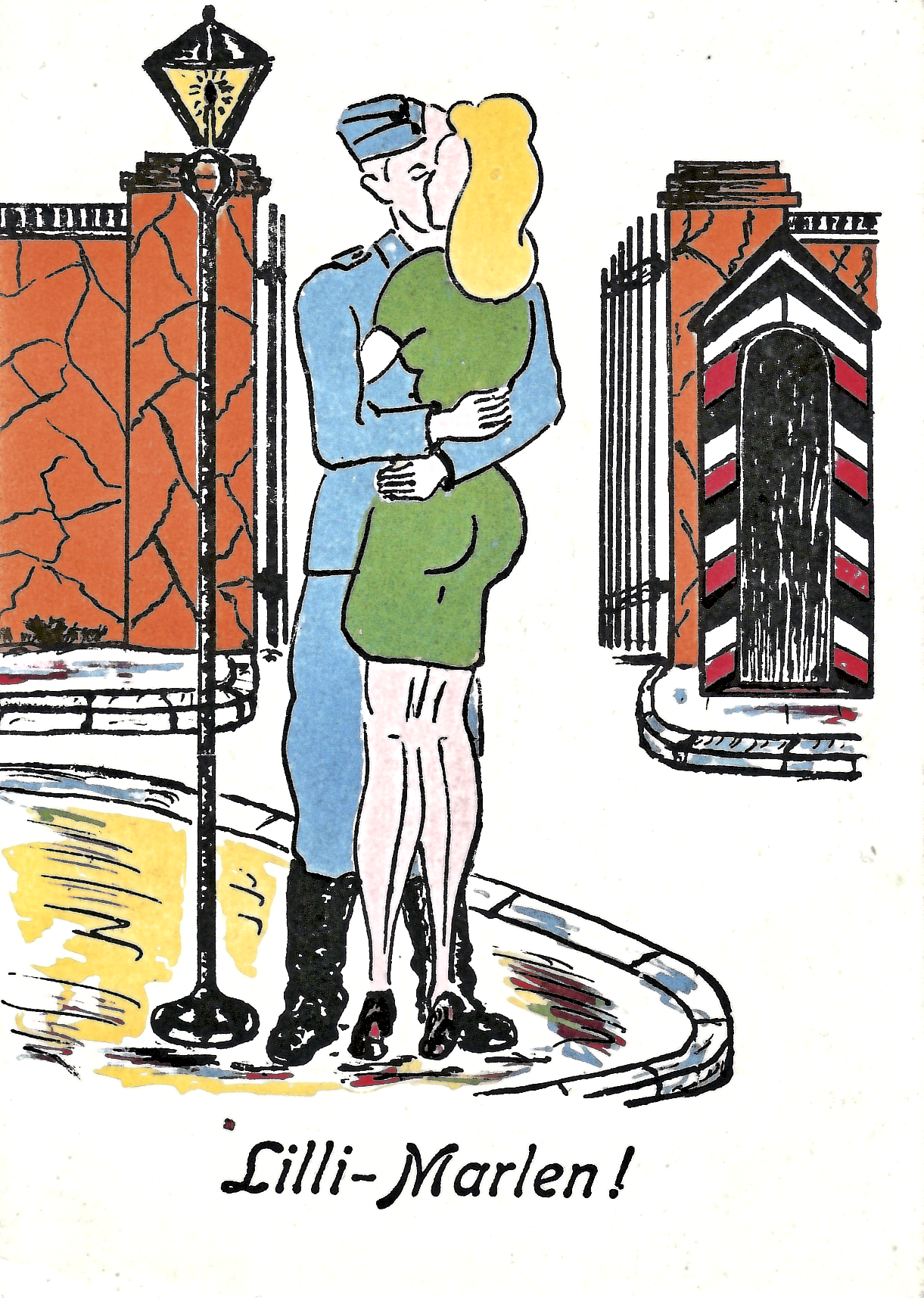
Propaganda postcard of the German Wehrmacht's postal service in Paris, 1942, with Lili Marleen motif

The words were written in 1915 as a poem of three verses by Hans Leip (1893–1983), a school teacher from Hamburg who had been conscripted into the Imperial German Army. Leip reportedly combined the nickname of his friend's girlfriend, Lili, with the name of another friend, Marleen, who was a nurse. The poem was later published in 1937 as "Das Lied eines jungen Soldaten auf der Wacht" ("The Song of a Young Soldier on Watch"), with two further verses added.

It was set to music by Norbert Schultze in 1938 and recorded by Lale Andersen for the first time in 1939. In early 1942, she recorded the song in English, the lyrics translated by Norman Baillie-Stewart, a former British army officer working for German propaganda.

Songwriter Tommie Connor also wrote English lyrics with the title "Lily of the Lamplight" in 1944. Another English translation was done by Theodore Stephanides during World War II and published in his memoir Climax in Crete in 1946.

== Exposure and reception ==
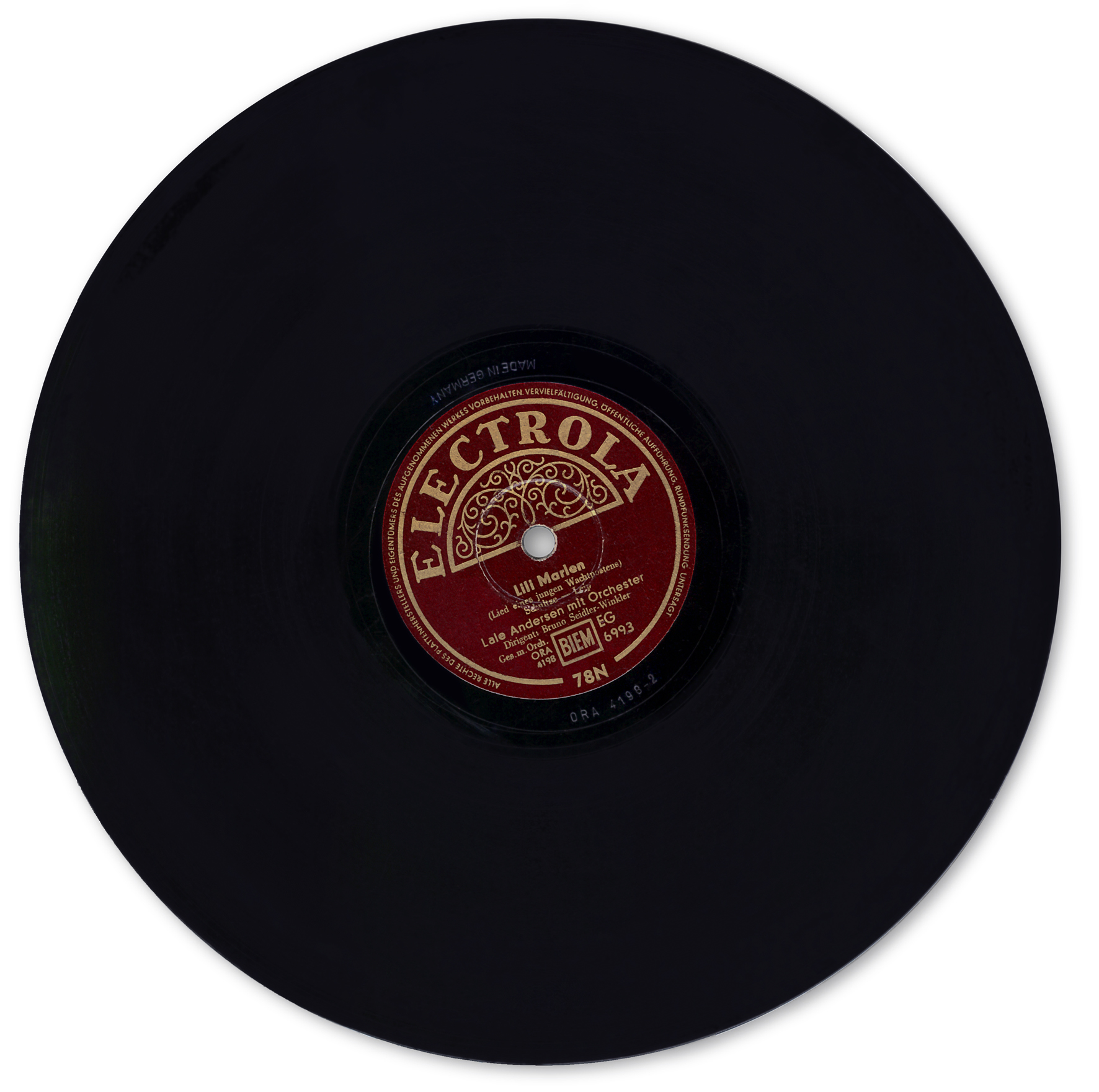
Electrola EC 6993/ORA 4198-2. First recording of Lili Marlen.

After the occupation of Belgrade in 1941, Radio Belgrade became the German forces' radio station under the name of Soldatensender Belgrad (Soldiers' Radio Belgrade), with transmissions heard throughout Europe and the Mediterranean.

While on leave in Vienna, a lieutenant working at the station was asked to collect a pile of second-hand records from the Reich radio station. Among them was "Lili Marleen" sung by Lale Andersen, which up till then had sold around 700 copies. Karl-Heinz Reintgen, the German officer in charge of the station, began playing the song on the air. For lack of other recordings, Radio Belgrade played the song frequently.

The song was published in South Africa, in a wartime leaflet, with an anonymous English translation, as "Lili Marleen: The Theme Song of the Eighth Army and the 6th Armoured Division".

Lale Andersen was awarded a gold disc for over one million sales (His Master's Voice – EG 6993). It is thought she was awarded her copy after hostilities ended. HMV's copy was discarded during renovations to their Oxford Street store in the 1960s, but the disc was recovered and is now in a private collection.

Many Allied soldiers made a point of listening to the song at the end of the day. For example, in his memoir Eastern Approaches, Fitzroy Maclean describes the song's effect in early 1942 during the Western Desert Campaign: "Husky, sensuous, nostalgic, sugar-sweet, her voice seemed to reach out to you, as she lingered over the catchy tune, the sickly sentimental words. Belgrade... The continent of Europe seemed a long way away. I wondered when I would see it again and what it would be like by the time we got there."

The next year, parachuted into the Yugoslav guerrilla war and living rough with Josip Broz Tito and his Yugoslav Partisans, Maclean wrote: "Sometimes at night, before going to sleep, we would turn on our receiving set and listen to Radio Belgrade. For months now, the flower of the Afrika Korps had been languishing behind the barbed wire of Allied prison camps. But still, punctually at ten o'clock, came Lale Andersen singing their special song, with the same unvarying, heart-rending sweetness that we knew so well from the desert. [...] Belgrade was still remote. But, now [...] it had become our ultimate goal, which Lili Marlene and her nostalgic little tune seemed somehow to symbolise."

In late 1944, the liberation of Belgrade seemed not far away. "Then, at ten o'clock, loud and clear, Radio Belgrade; Lili Marlene, sweet, insidious, melancholy. 'Not much longer now,' we would say, as we switched it off." As the Red Army was advancing on Belgrade, he reflected again on the song. "At Valjevo, as at so many other places [...] we would tune our wireless sets in the evening to Radio Belgrade, and night after night, always at the same time, would come, throbbing lingeringly over the ether, the cheap, sugary and almost painfully nostalgic melody, the sex-laden, intimate, heart-rending accents of Lili Marlene. 'Not gone yet,' we would say to each other. 'I wonder if we'll find her when we get there.' Then one evening at the accustomed time there was silence. 'Gone away,' we said."

Allied soldiers in Italy later adapted the tune to their own lyrics, creating the "D-Day Dodgers" song. A cartoon by Bill Mauldin in the American army newspaper Stars and Stripes shows two soldiers in a foxhole, one playing a harmonica, while the other comments, "The krauts ain't following ya too good on 'Lili Marlene' tonight, Joe. Think somethin' happened to their tenor?"

== Marlene Dietrich version ==
"Lili Marlene"
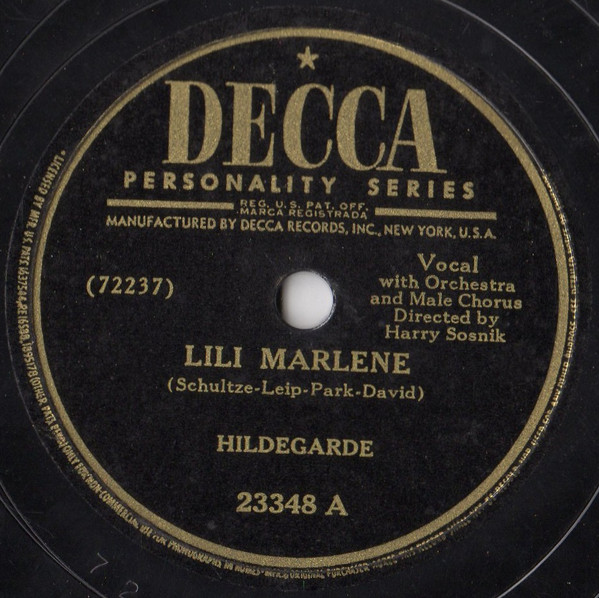

Single by Marlene Dietrich
- B-side: "Symphonie"
- Released: 7 September 1945
- Recorded: 1944
- Genre: Jazz; Pop
- Length: 4:45
- Label: Decca (US); Brunswick (UK); MCA (re-issue)
- Songwriters: Norbert Schultze; Hans Leip; English lyrics: Mack David

Marlene Dietrich singles chronology
"Falling in Love Again" (1939)	"Lili Marlene" (1945)	"Illusions" (1948)

In 1944, the Morale Operations Branch of the U.S. Office of Strategic Services (OSS) initiated the Muzak Project, musical propaganda broadcasts designed to demoralize enemy soldiers. Marlene Dietrich, the only performer who was told her recordings would be for OSS use, recorded several songs in German for the project, including "Lili Marleen". Dietrich performed it, as well as many other songs, live in Europe for Allied troops, often on rickety, makeshift stages.

"Lili Marleen" became the theme song on the German language OSS MO radio station Soldatensender. After its warm reception by the troops in Europe, the song was re-recorded and released, with the spelling "Lili Marlene" after her name, Marlene, with Charles Magnante on the accordion, as the "orchestra director", with the disk' B-side, as "Symphonie", sung in French. It was released by Decca Records in 1945. The original OSS recording of "Lili Marleen" remained thus unissued.

In 1961, Dietrich starred in the film Judgment at Nuremberg, a dramatization of the war trials. In one scene she walks down a rubbled street, ravaged by Allied attacks, with Spencer Tracy's character. As they approach a bar they hear men inside singing "Lili Marleen" in German. Dietrich begins to sing along with the song, translating a few lyrics for Tracy, referring to the German lyrics as "much sadder" than the English.

While she was touring the world in live one-woman cabaret shows from 1953 to 1975, the song was part of Dietrich's usual line-up, usually following "Falling in Love Again". She always introduced her signature song with some variation of this quote, from a 1960s concert, somewhere in Europe:

Now, here is a song that is very close to my heart. I sang it during the war. I sang it for three long years, all through Africa, Sicily, Italy, to Alaska, Greenland, Iceland, to England, through France, through Belgium ... [long pause] ... to Germany, and to Czechoslovakia. The soldiers loved it, 'Lili Marlene'.

Dietrich sang "Lili Marlene" in her television special An Evening with Marlene Dietrich, which aired on the BBC in the UK and on CBS in the US in 1973, and was featured on four of her six original albums. She also recorded and performed it in both the original German version and the English adaptation. Both versions have appeared on many compilation albums worldwide, several of them titled after the song. After 5 shows in Japan, between 15 and 25 December 1974, two singles of the song were released by both EMI and MCA Records in 1975. The MCA Records release (D-1284) peaked #93 in the Oricon charts and spend three weeks there, and sold a total of 8,000 copies, this version has "Falling in Love Again" as a B-side. The EMI release (EMR-10761) peaked #42 in the charts and spend 11 weeks in it, selling a total of 56,000 in the country, this version has "Die Antwort Weiss Ganz Allein Der Wind" (Blowin' In The Wind) as a B-side.

=== Track listings ===
==== English version ====
===== 10" single =====
Original issuing of the song by Decca Records in the US and Brunswick Records in the UK was on 10-inch. Decca re-issued the single on 7-inch during the 1950s and early 1970s. This is also the version of the single that was reissued by MCA in 1978 and 1980 on 7-inch.

Side A
No.	Title	Writer(s)	Length
1.	"Lili Marlene"	Norbert Schultze; Hans Leip; Mack David	3:24

Side B
No.	Title	Writer(s)	Length
1.	"Symphonie" (sung in French)	Alex Alstone; André Gaston Isaac Tabet; Roger Bernstein	2:55

===== 7" Brunswick re-issue =====
Most likely re-issued in the 1970s, it was originally released in the Netherlands on 7-inch by Brunswick Records. This version of the single was re-issued again in the UK in 1989, and in 1992 it was issued in Germany, both by MCA, the 1989 re-issue also having been released by Old Gold Records.

Side A
No.	Title	Writer(s)	Length
1.	"Lili Marlene"	Norbert Schultze; Hans Leip; Mack David	3:24

Side B
No.	Title	Writer(s)	Length
1.	"Falling in Love Again"	Friedrich Hollaender; Sammy Lerner	3:03

==== German version ====
===== 7" EP Philips issue =====
Released in 1959 by Philips Records in association with Columbia Records on 7-inch in the Netherlands, it was intended as an abridged extended play version of an internationally released compilation album of the same name, consisting of songs sung in German by Dietrich.

Side A
No.	Title	Writer(s)	Length
1.	"Lili Marlene" (sung in German)	Norbert Schultze; Hans Leip	2:56
2.	"Du, Du Liegst Mir Im Herzen"	Traditional	2:02
Total length:			4:58

Side B
No.	Title	Writer(s)	Length
1.	"Muss I Denn"	Fred Wise; Ben Weisman; Kay Twomey; Bert Kaempfert	2:13
2.	"Du Hast Die Seele Mein"	Unknown	2:03
Total length:			4:16

===== 7" Columbia International issue =====
Released in 1961 by CBS Records on 7-inch in the Netherlands.

Side A
No.	Title	Writer(s)	Length
1.	"Lili Marlene" (sung in German)	Norbert Schultze; Hans Leip	2:56

Side B
No.	Title	Writer(s)	Length
1.	"Du, Du Liegst Mir Im Herzen"	Traditional	2:02

===== 7" EMI Italiana issue =====
Released in 1962 by EMI Italiana on 7-inch in Italy.

Side A
No.	Title	Writer(s)	Length
1.	"Lili Marlen" (sung in German)	Schultze; Leip; Apollo	2:56

Side B
No.	Title	Writer(s)	Length
1.	"Ich Bin Die Fesche Lola"	Hollander; Liebmann; Wiener; Boheme	1:33

=== Personnel ===
List of personnel for the original 1945 single.

- Marlene Dietrich – vocalist
- Charles Magnante – orchestra director, accordion
- Charles Magnate Orchestral

== Connie Francis version ==
"Lili Marleen"

Single by Connie Francis
- B-side: "Mond von Mexico"
- Released: 1962
- Recorded: A-side: 3 June 1961; B-side: 5 October 1961; (both at Austrophon Studio, Vienna)
- Genre: Schlager music
- Length: 1:55
- Label: MGM Records (61 053)
- Songwriters: Norbert Schultze; Hans Leip
- Producer: Gerhard Mendelsohn

Connie Francis German singles chronology
"Eine Insel für zwei" (1962)	"Lili Marleen" (1962)	"Tu' mir nicht weh" (1962)

American entertainer Connie Francis recorded "Lili Marlene" on 3 June 1961. She recorded the single's B-side, "Mond von Mexico", on 5 October 1961. Both songs were recorded in Vienna, Austria, at the Austrophon Studio. The single was released in 1962, marking her seventh single in German. Francis also recorded the song in Italian and French. Her version of "Lili Marleen" peaked at number 9 on the German music charts.

=== Track listing ===
==== 7" ====
Credits adapted from the liner notes of original release.

Side A
No.	Title	Writer(s)	Length
1.	"Lili Marlene"	Norbert Schultze; Hans Leip	1:55

Side B
No.	Title	Writer(s)	Length
1.	"Mond von Mexico"	Fini Busch; Werner Scharfenberger	2:41

=== Personnel ===
- Fini Busch – composer (B)
- Connie Francis – vocalist
- Hans Leip – composer (A)
- Gerhard Mendelsohn – producer
- Werner Scharfenberger – composer (B)
- Norbert Schultze – composer (A)

=== Chart performance ===
Chart (1962)	Peak position
Germany	9

== Amanda Lear version ==
"Lili Marleen"

Single by Amanda Lear

from the album Never Trust a Pretty Face
- B-side: "Pretty Boys", "Dreamer (South Pacific)"
- Released: 1978
- Recorded: 1978
- Genre: Euro disco
- Length: 4:45
- Label: Ariola Records
- Songwriters: Norbert Schultze; Hans Leip; Tommie Connor
- Producer: Anthony Monn

Amanda Lear singles chronology
"Gold" (1978)	"Lili Marleen" (1978)	"The Sphinx" (1978)

French singer Amanda Lear recorded a Eurodisco cover of the song in 1978 and released it as the B-side of the single "Gold" as well as a standalone single. The German-English language version later appeared on her third studio LP Never Trust a Pretty Face. French editions of the album included a German-French version of the track.

Lear performed "Lili Marleen" in the 1978 Italian film Zio Adolfo in arte Führer.

The singer later re-recorded the song for her albums Cadavrexquis (1993) and Heart (2001), the latter version with updated lyrics, written by Norbert Schultze shortly before his death.

=== Track listing ===
- 7-inch single (1978)
  1. "Lili Marleen" – 4:45
  2. "Pretty Boys" – 2:55
- 7-inch Argentine single (1979)
  1. "Lili Marlene" – 4:45
  2. "Soñador (Sur Pacifico)" ("Dreamer (South Pacific)") – 5:15

=== Chart performance ===
Weekly chart performance for "Lili Marleen"
Chart (1979)	Peak position
Italy (Musica e dischi)	11
France (IFOP)	34

== Other versions ==
The Italian version, translated by lyricist Nino Rastelli and recorded in 1942 by Lina Termini, was probably the first to be released; the earliest English language recording of the song was probably Anne Shelton's, but other cover versions followed. A version called "The D-Day Dodgers" with words by Harry Pynn was sung by the allied troops in Italy once the Normandy invasion had begun in 1944. A recording was made by Perry Como on 27 June 1944 and issued by RCA Victor on 78 rpm (catalog number 20-1592-A) with the flip side "First Class Private Mary Brown". This recording was later re-issued as catalog number 20-2824-A with flip side "I Love You Truly". The song reached chart position #13 on the United States charts. The song was recorded during the musicians' strike and consequently has a backing chorus instead of an orchestral backup. A version with French words by Henri Lemarchand was recorded by Suzy Solidor in 1941. Lilly Hodácová recorded the first version in Czech, shortly before the end of the war. Other artists who recorded the song included Hildegarde (on Decca), Bing Crosby (recorded 30 December 1947), Martha Tilton (on Coral), and Vaughn Monroe (on V-Disc). Al Martino revived the song for Capitol Records in 1968. Another version was recorded in the 1960s by Hank Locklin, Connie Francis and Vera Lynn. A German version of the song also covered by Edith 'Lolita' Zuser. An instrumental version was also covered by Billy Vaughn. Hank Snow also recorded a version in 1963 on his album "I've Been Everywhere". Another French singer, Patricia Kaas used "Lili Marlene" as an intro for her song "D'Allemagne" and sang the entire song during concerts in the 1990s. In the early 1970s, Harry Hibbs recorded a version of the song for his TV show. Matia Bazar (Italy) recorded an uptempo beat song called "Lili Marleen" on her 1982 album Berlino, Parigi, Londra. The song is a "spoken words" early 1980s dance track. Spanish group Olé Olé, led by Marta Sánchez, released an electro-pop version of the song in 1985. It became one of the best-selling singles in Spain of the 1980s, and paved way for the singer to have a successful career. The song was eventually included in the also best-selling album Bailando sin salir de casa in 1986. German blackmetal band Eisregen recorded a version of "Lili Marlene" on their album Hexenhaus. The German Gothic metal/Industrial metal band Atrocity released the song in both languages (English & German) on Gemini: on the blue edition was the German version, and on the red edition was the English version. Kid Creole and the Coconuts included an uptempo, disco-influenced version of "Lili Marlene", with German lyrics sung by Coconut Adriana Kaegi, on their 1980 debut LP release Off the Coast of Me. Carly Simon recorded the song as the third track on her 1997 Arista CD Film Noir. It has also been translated into Hawaiian by Kiope Raymond, and recorded by Raymond and Pearl Rose on Rose's 2000 album Homecoming. Most recently it was recorded by Neil Hannon of the Irish pop group The Divine Comedy as a B-side to the 2006 single "A Lady of a Certain Age". A slow-tempo instrumental version can be found on the compilation LP, Vienna: City of Dreams, by the Austrian zither master Anton Karas. "Lili Marlene" has been adopted as the regimental slow march by the Special Air Service, Special Air Service Regiment and Princess Patricia's Canadian Light Infantry, and its melody is the basis of the official march of Kodam III/Siliwangi in the Indonesian Army.

During WWII Soviet counterpropaganda officer (and future dissident) Lev Kopelev wrote a parody of the original song for demoralization of enemy soldiers. The original text (in German) of this parody is lost, but famous Russian poet Joseph Brodsky wrote a poem in Russian, based on this parody. The poem is quite different from the original German song, though many Russians think the Brodsky version is an exact translation.

== Other interpretations ==
- It has been sung and marched as 'passacaille' and slow march by the Military of Chile in its adaptation to the Spanish Language.
- It is also adapted to Indonesian as "March of Siliwangi Division" of the Indonesian Army. It was first sung by the Siliwangi Division while marching from West Java to Yogyakarta as a result of the Renville Agreement with the Dutch Government in February 1948. The song has 2 languages in 1 song, Indonesian and Sundanese (language used by the people of West Java).
- Humphrey Jennings directed the 29-minute-long film The True Story of Lili Marlene in 1944 about the song.
- The song features prominently in Lili Marlene (1950), starring Lisa Daniely. The film tells a fictionalised version of the story of the woman (played by Daniely) who purportedly inspired the song.
- The song is sung in a bar in Germany in the 1961 film Judgment at Nuremberg. In a scene featuring Marlene Dietrich (who recorded the song several times), and Spencer Tracy, Dietrich's character explains to Tracy's that the German words are much sadder than the English translations.
- The song's popularity among both Allied and Axis troops in the Western Desert front during World War Two was described in the British television program The World at War, a documentary series broadcast in 1973–74 and narrated by Laurence Olivier, in Episode 8, "The Desert: North Africa 1940–1943".
- Rainer Werner Fassbinder directed the 1980 film Lili Marleen, the story of Lale Andersen and her version of the song.
- In 1981 Matia Bazar inserted a cover of Lili Marleen, in the original German language, on their album Berlino, Parigi, Londra (Side A – track 1).
- The song is featured prominently in a scene of a 1983 Yugoslavian film Balkan Express set during World War II. In the scene, a bar singer (portrayed by popular folk singer Toma Zdravković) refuses to sing the song to some German soldiers who then escort him out of the bar. Later in the scene, he returns to the stage and is depicted singing the song with blood on his face, implying he had been persuaded into singing by beating.
- Estonian punk rock band Vennaskond released an Estonian version of the song on their album Usk. Lootus. Armastus. in 1993. Another Estonian group, Swing Swindlers, recorded a melancholy swinging version in 2007 (both in German and Estonian) and featured the song in their film Berlin 1945: Musik Unter Bomben with vocals by Mart Sander, Kelli Uustani, Nele-Liis Vaiksoo, and Pirjo Levandi.
- The 2009 film Bad Day to Go Fishing, directed by Alvaro Brechner, showed an uncontrollable titan (Jouko Ahola) who could only be appeased by the melody of "Lili Marlene".
- Dutch folk band Omnia recorded a version of the song on their 2011 album Musick and Poëtree.
- The song appears in the prelude scene of the 2023 film Indiana Jones and the Dial of Destiny, where it is sung by a group of German soldiers having supper.
