= Bulgarian Wikipedia =

Bulgarian-language edition of Wikipedia

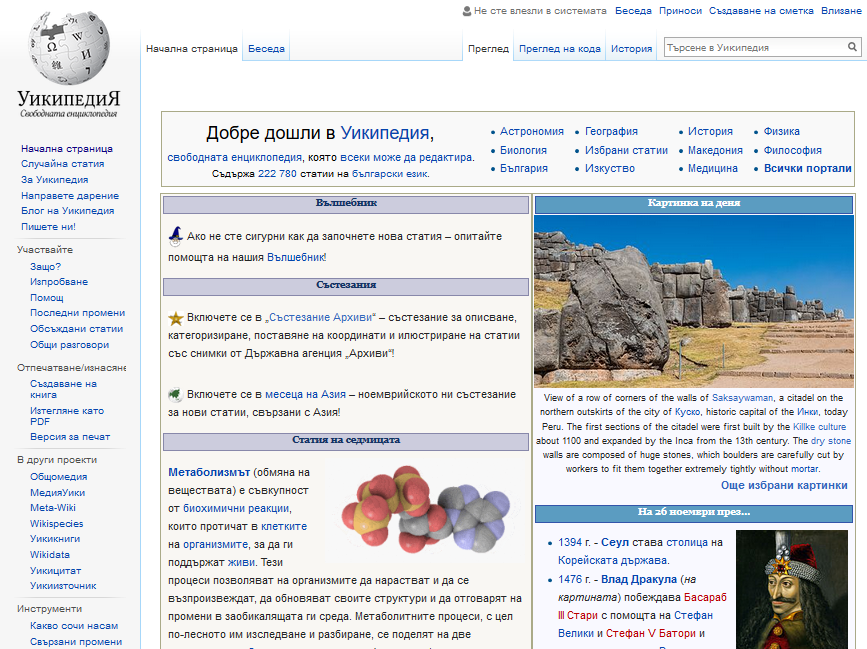
- Main page of the Bulgarian Wikipedia on 26 November 2016
- Website type: Internet encyclopedia project
- Available in: Bulgarian
- Headquarters: Miami, Florida
- Owner: Wikimedia Foundation
- Website: bg.wikipedia.org
- Commercial: Charitable
- Registration: Optional
- Users: 410100
- Launched: 6 December 2003
- Content license: Creative Commons Attribution/ Share-Alike 4.0 (most text also dual-licensed under GFDL); Media licensing varies

The Bulgarian Wikipedia (Bulgarian: Българоезична Уикипедия, romanized: Bulgaroezichna Uikipediya or Уикипедия на български език, romanized: Uikipediya na bulgarski ezik) is the Bulgarian-language edition of Wikipedia. It was founded on 6 December 2003, and on 12 June 2015 it passed the 200,000 articles threshold. It is written in the Bulgarian (Cyrillic) Alphabet. As of 23 October 2026, it has 312,651 articles and is the 42nd largest Wikipedia edition.

== Users ==
As of 23 October 2026, the Bulgarian Wikipedia has 410,100 registered users and 1740 of them are active users. Bulgarian Wikipedia has a Bulgarian alphabet (Cyrillic) interface and users can include Cyrillic letters for their Wikipedia names. The user boxes and all other personal content is in Cyrillic. This is also due to the need of one username for all Wikipedia languages registrations and edits, while many of the Bulgarian Wikipedians also contribute to the English, French, etc. Wikipedias where Cyrillic nicknames may be hard to read or pronounce.

== History ==
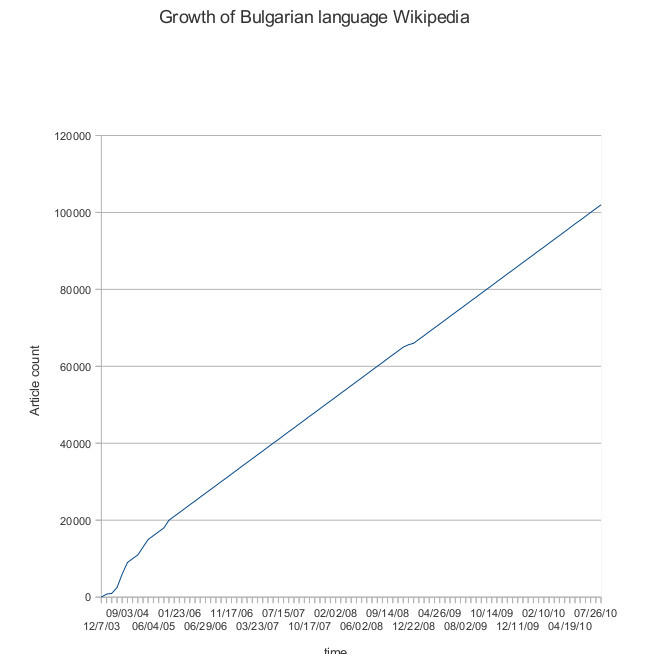
Growth of articles number in Bulgarian Wikipedia

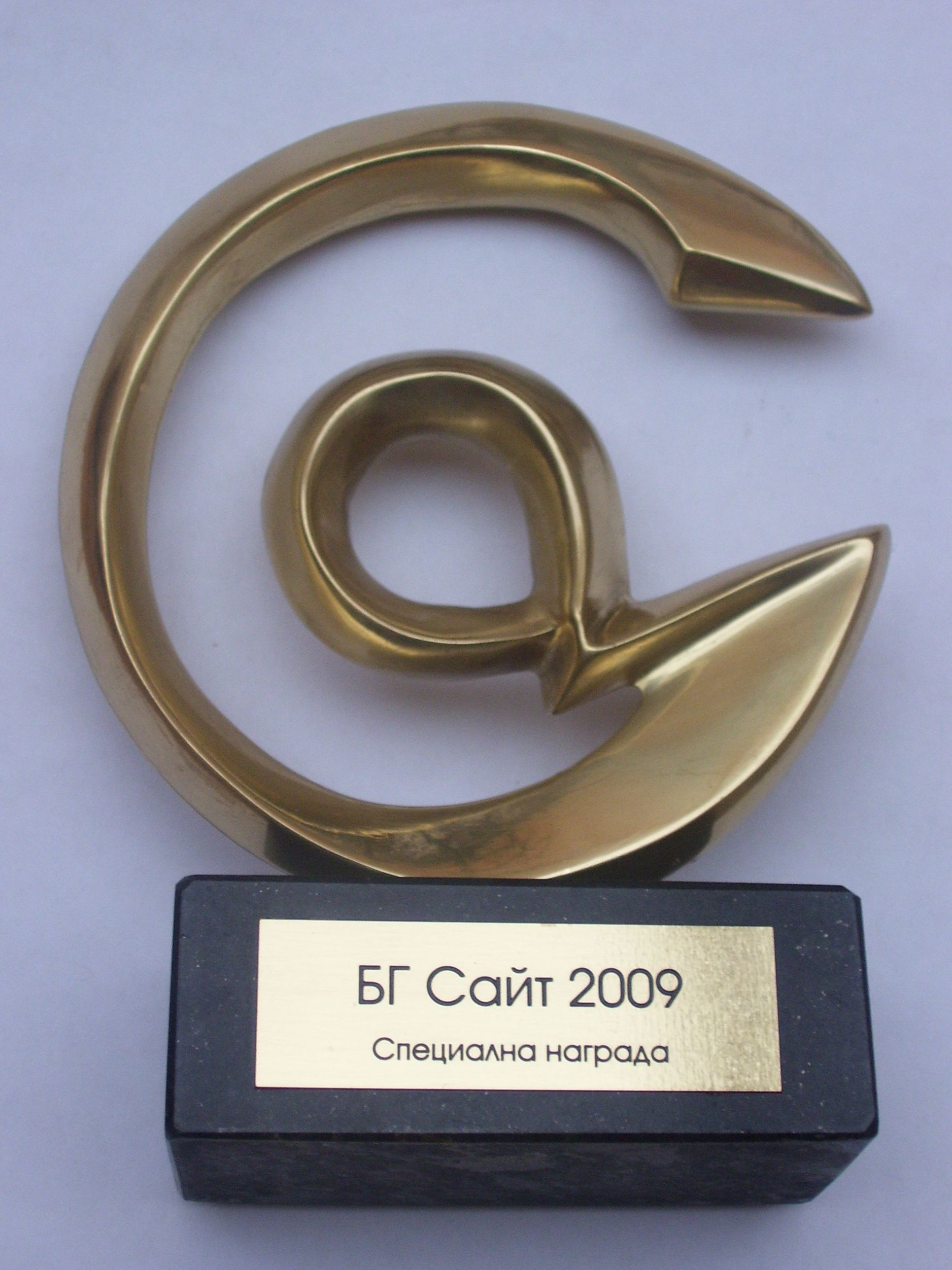
Bulgarian web award received in 2009, Bulgarian Wikipedia was nominated Bg Site for its contributions to the development of the Bulgarian web.

The Bulgarian Wikipedia was created on 6 December 2003. In 2005 Bulgarian Wikipedia added its 20,000th article and was the 21st largest Wikipedia at the time. Later in 2007 it was the 30th largest Wikipedia by article count, with over 50,000 articles. On 24 May 2010, the distinctive Wikipedia globe logo for the Bulgarian Wikipedia was temporarily altered to include the number 100,000 to commemorate the 100,000 article milestone, it became the 32nd largest Wikipedia by size and now it holds 33rd place with more than 200,000 articles.

=== Timeline ===
- On 3 October 2004, the 10,000th article was created.
- On 26 December 2007, the 50,000th article.
- On 24 May 2010, the 100,000th article.
- On 17 July 2013, the 150,000th article.
- On 12 June 2015, the 200,000th article.
- On 17 August 2024, the 300,000th article.

== Multimedia ==
As of March 2010 Bulgarian Wikipedia uses only Commons for pictures and multimedia uploads and local uploads are switched off. The existing files are gradually moved to Commons.
