= Lale Andersen =

German singer-songwriter (1905–1972)

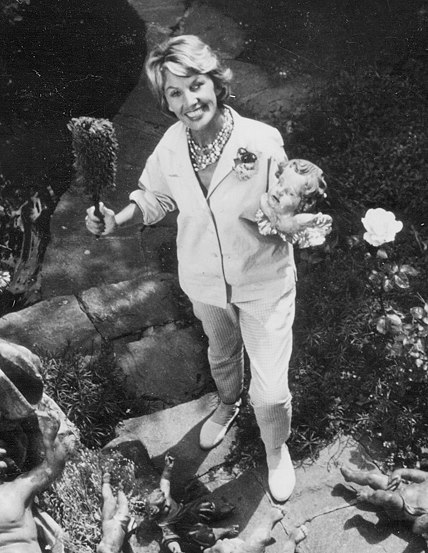
- Andersen in her garden, c. 1961
- Born: Elisabeth Carlotta Helena Berta Bunnenberg; 23 March 1905; Lehe, Bremerhaven, German Empire
- Died: 29 August 1972 (aged 67); Vienna, Austria
- Resting place: Langeoog, East Frisian Islands, Lower Saxony, Germany
- Other names: Liselotte Wilke, Nicola Wilke
- Occupations: Singer, recording artist, lyricist, music writer, actress
- Spouses: German Impressionist painter Paul Ernst Wilke (m. 1922; div. 1931); Artur Beul (m. 1949)

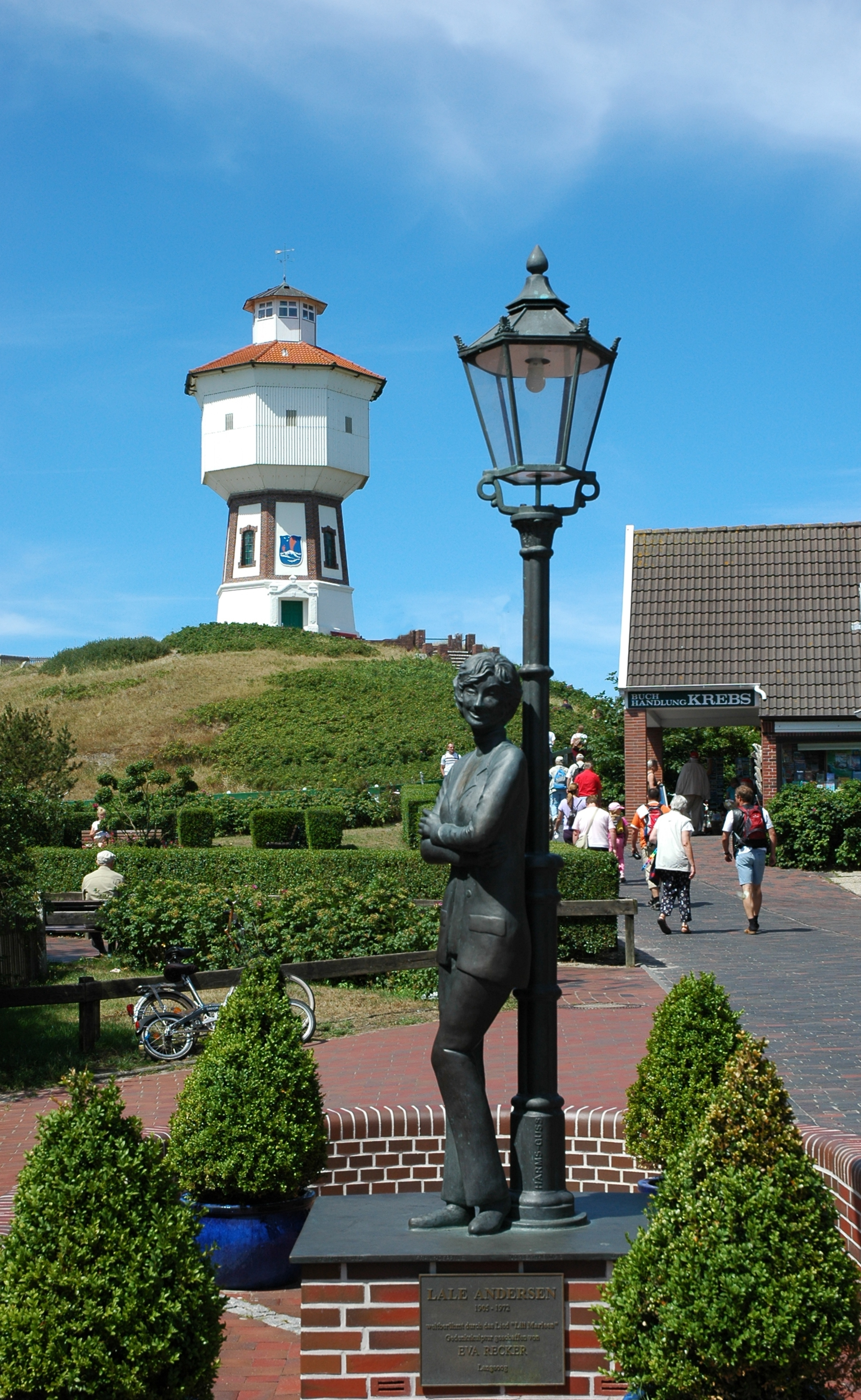
A memorial to Lale Andersen and "Lili Marleen" on Langeoog Island, Germany

Lale Andersen (23 March 1905 – 29 August 1972) was a German chanson singer-songwriter (Note: Lale Andersen often wrote her own lyrics, usually under the pseudonym Nicola Wilke.) born in Lehe (now part of Bremerhaven). (Note: Lehe at the time of her birth was an independent municipality. It is now part of Bremerhaven. In 1924 Lehe was amalgamated with the neighbouring Geestemünde to become the city of Wesermünde. Bremerhaven, which was founded in 1827, was merged into Wesermünde in 1939. In 1947, Wesermünde became part of the state of Bremen and was renamed as Bremerhaven.) She is best known for her interpretation of the song "Lili Marleen" in 1939, which by 1942 transcended the conflict to become World War II's biggest international hit. Popular with both the Axis and the Allies, Andersen's original recording spawned versions, by the end of the War, in most of the major languages of Europe, and by some of the most popular artists in their respective countries.

== Biography ==
=== Early life ===
Andersen was born in Lehe and baptized Elisabeth Carlotta Helena Berta Bunnenberg, but known informally as "Liese-Lotte"—a diminutive of her first two names—to friends and family; this continued after her first marriage when she was known as "Liselotte Wilke".

In 1922, aged 17, (Note: Although some online resources give 1924 as the year of the marriage, Lehrke's book contains a copy of the wedding announcement that had appeared in the Nordwestdeutsche Zeitung on 1 April 1922.) she married German Impressionist painter Paul Ernst Wilke (1894–1971). (Note: In her early career, Lale Andersen was sometimes billed as Liselotte Wilke.) They had three children: Björn, Carmen-Litta, and Michael Wilke (1929–2017) the youngest of whom also enjoyed a career in the German music industry. Shortly after the birth of their last child, the marriage broke up. Leaving the children in the care of her siblings Thekla and Helmut, Andersen went to Berlin in October 1929, where she reportedly studied acting at the Schauspielschule at the Deutsches Theater. In 1931, her marriage ended in divorce. Around this time, she began appearing on stage in various cabarets in Berlin. From 1933 to 1937, she performed at the Schauspielhaus in Zürich, where she also met Rolf Liebermann, who would remain a close friend for the rest of her life. In 1938, she was in Munich at the cabaret Simpl, and soon afterwards joined the prestigious Kabarett der Komiker (Comedians' Cabaret) in Berlin.

=== "Lili Marleen" and the war years ===
While at the Kabarett der Komiker, she met Norbert Schultze, who had composed the music for "Lili Marleen". Andersen recorded the song in 1939, but it would become a hit only when the Soldatensender Belgrad (Belgrade Soldier's Radio), the radio station of the German armed forces in Eastern Europe, began broadcasting it in 1941. "Lili Marleen" quickly became immensely popular with German soldiers at the "front". The transmitter of the radio station at Belgrade, was powerful enough to be received all over Europe and the Mediterranean, and the song soon became popular with the Allied troops as well.

Andersen was awarded a gold disc for over one million sales of "Lili Marleen" [His Master's Voice – EG 6993]. It is thought that she was awarded her copy after the end of World War II. A copy of this particular gold disc owned by the "His Master's Voice" label was discarded during the renovation of their flagship store on Oxford Street, London, during the 1960s where, hitherto, it had been on display. However, the disc was recovered and is now in a private collection. Nazi officials did not approve of the song and Joseph Goebbels prohibited it from being played on the radio. Andersen was not allowed to perform in public for nine months, not just because of the song but because of her friendship with Rolf Liebermann and other Jewish artists she had met in Zurich. In desperation, she reportedly attempted suicide. Andersen was so popular, however, that the Nazi government allowed her to perform again, albeit subject to several conditions, one of which was she would not sing "Lili Marleen". Goebbels did order her to make a new "military" version of the song (with a significant drum) which was recorded in June 1942. In the remaining war years, Andersen had one minor appearance in a 1942 Nazi propaganda movie and was made to sing several propaganda songs in English. Shortly before the end of the war, Andersen retired to Langeoog, a small island off the North Sea coast of Germany.

=== Career after World War II ===
After the war, Andersen all but disappeared as a singer. In 1949, she married Swiss composer Artur Beul. In 1952 she made a comeback with the song "Die blaue Nacht am Hafen", the lyrics of which she had written for herself. In 1959, she had another hit "Ein Schiff wird kommen...", a cover version of "Never on Sunday", the title song from the movie of the same name, originally sung in Greek by Melina Mercouri.

Each song won her a gold album in West Germany. In 1961, she participated as the West German representative in the Eurovision Song Contest with the song "Einmal sehen wir uns wieder", which only reached 13th place with three points. Fifty-six years old at the time, she held the record of the eldest participant at Eurovision for over 45 years – surpassed only in 2008 by the 75-year-old Croatian entertainer 75 Cents. However, she is the oldest Eurovision participant by birth date.

Throughout the 1960s, she toured Europe, the United States and Canada, until her farewell tour Goodbye memories in 1967. Two years later, she published a book Wie werde ich Haifisch? – Ein heiterer Ratgeber für alle, die Schlager singen, texten oder komponieren wollen (How do I become a shark? – A cheerful companion for all who want to sing hit songs, write lyrics, or compose music), and in 1972, shortly before her death, her autobiography Der Himmel hat viele Farben (The Sky Has Many Colours) appeared and topped the bestselling list of the West German magazine Der Spiegel.

=== Death ===
Andersen died of liver cancer in Vienna on 29 August 1972, aged 67. Her death was the first among female Eurovision contestants and German-speaking Eurovision contestants and, following Jacques Pills and Jean-Paul Mauric, the third among Eurovision contestants in general; Mauric also appeared in Eurovision 1961.

== Footnotes ==
Preceded by Wyn Hoop with Bonne nuit ma chérie	Germany in the Eurovision Song Contest; 1961	Succeeded by Conny Froboess with Zwei kleine Italiener
