= The Magic of Marlene (1969 album) =

- North America box set edition cover

Box set by Marlene Dietrich
- Released: 1969
- Recorded: 1960–1965
- Genre: Traditional pop, cabaret
- Label: Capitol

Marlene Dietrich chronology
The Legendary Marlene Dietrich (1967)	The Magic of Marlene (1969)	The Magic of Marlene (1973)

The Magic of Marlene is a box set by German-American singer and actress Marlene Dietrich, released in 1969 by Capitol Records. The three-record collection compiles songs drawn from three of Dietrich’s studio albums released earlier in the 1960s, bringing together a selection of her most notable German-language recordings, including the iconic "Lili Marlene". Marketed as a deluxe edition, the set was part of Capitol’s prestigious year-end lineup and promoted as a high-quality gift item for the holiday season.

Critics praised the compilation for its thoughtful curation and the inclusion of rare photos and biographical material, offering a comprehensive overview of Dietrich's artistic legacy.

== Album details ==
According to Cash Box, the box set The Magic of Marlene comprised a three-record set gathering Marlene Dietrich's recordings, aligning with the same line of deluxe products that Capitol released in the end of 1969, included big band compilations, Broadway musicals, and notable soundtracks. The magazine stated that Capitol's intention was to offer sophisticated editions aimed not only at each artist's regular audience but also as gift options with strong commercial appeal.

The Magic of Marlene combines three 1960s albums: Wiedersehen mit Marlene (1960), Die neue Marlene (titled only Marlene in the LP) (1964), and Marlene singt Berlin, Berlin (1965) (titled Marlene Dietrich's Berlin). The first album originated during Dietrich's emotionally charged 1960 return to West Germany, a tour marked by both public admiration and intense hostility. Despite artistic success, the tour's financial failure and personal toll led her to refuse future returns. Marketed as live, the album was actually studio recordings enhanced with overdubbed applause, though the reissue removed these effects. The album included in the box set omitted three songs: "Wer wird denn weinen", "Ich hab' noch einen Koffer in Berlin", and "Ein richtiger Mann (Kinder, heut abend)".

Recorded in London in 1964, Die neue Marlene (The New Marlene) introduced Dietrich's renewed artistic direction. Featuring chansons, a Christmas track, and a new Spoliansky composition, the album notably departed from her earlier collaborations with Burt Bacharach. Originally planned as Sag mir wo die Blumen sind, it was retitled to reflect her evolving public image and creative reinvention. In addition to being retitled as Marlene, the original songs from side B were included on the first side of the record. Two songs from the original album were omitted: "Sag mir, wo die Blumen sind" and "Sch, kleines Baby".

Marlene singt Berlin, Berlin, later retitled Marlene's Berlin, was originally released in 1965 as a 16-song tribute to the artist's hometown. Two songs from the original tracklist were excluded from the box set: "Wenn ein Mädel einen Herrn hat" and "Es gibt im Leben manches Mal Momente".

== Release and promotion ==
On September 27, 1969, Cash Box reported that the LP The Magic of Marlene would be released by Capitol Records as part of its Christmas season strategy, within a series of box sets and special editions prepared for the holiday period. According to the magazine, Capitol launched an extensive holiday advertising and promotional campaign in 1969 to support its deluxe LP gift sets series, including the three-record collection The Magic of Marlene. The label invested heavily in national and in-store marketing, with full-color ads appearing in Esquire and Holiday, commercials running on The Tonight Show Starring Johnny Carson, and around 300 television spots airing in major U.S. markets, which reached more than 60 million viewers. The campaign also extended to youth-oriented publications such as Scholastic Magazine and Co-Ed Magazine, while stores received custom display stands that held up to 250 sets.

== Critical reception ==
Professional ratings
Review scores
Source	Rating
The Encyclopedia of Popular Music	3/5 stars

RPM described the album as a "3 record set containing 40 of Marlene's exceptional German-language hits" with "bio and rare pics of fascinating entertainer".

In a 1970 issue, Saturday Review featured the album in its section dedicated to record releases, recommending it as "a wonderful evening with the incredible Dietrich" and highlighting that it included 34 songs such as "Naughty Little Lola", "Falling in Love Again", and "Lili Marlene".

== Track listing ==
Side A – Wiedersehen mit Marlene
No.	Title	Writer(s)	Length
1.	"Ich bin von Kopf bis Fuß auf Liebe eingestellt"	Friedrich Hollaender	2:55
2.	"Ich Bin Die Fesche Lola"	Hollaender, Richard Rillo	1:59
3.	"Mein Blondes Baby"	Fritz Rotter, Peter Kreuder	4:08
4.	"Peter"	Hollaender, Peter Kreuder	3:37
5.	"Allein in Einer Grossen Stadt"	Franz Wachsmann, Max Colpet, Kurt Gerhardt	5:18

Side B – Wiedersehen mit Marlene
No.	Title	Writer(s)	Length
6.	"Wenn Ich Mir 'Was Wunschen Dürfte"	Hollander	3:40
7.	"Johnny, wenn du Geburtstag hast"	Hollander	3:05
8.	"Marie - Marie"	Gilbert Becaud, Pierre Delanoe	5:00
9.	"Lili Marlene"	Norbert Schultze, Hans Leip	2:57
10.	"Ich weiß nicht, zu wem ich gehöre"	Hollaender, Robert Liebmann	2:40

Side C – Marlene
No.	Title	Writer(s)	Length
1.	"Der Trommelmann"	Harry Simeone, K.K. Davis, Henry Onoratir	2:41
2.	"Wenn der sommer wieder einzieht"	Dick Robertson, Frank Weldon, James Cavanaugh, Lothar Metzl	3:01
3.	"Ich werde dich lieben"	Bruce Welch, Marlene Dietrich	2:45
4.	"Paff, der Zauberdrachen"	Fred Oldörp, Leonard Lipton, Peter Yarrow	4:06
5.	"Mutter, hast du mir vergeben"	Czesław Niemen, Jacek Grań, Dietrich	4:09

Side D – Marlene
No.	Title	Writer(s)	Length
6.	"Wenn die Soldaten"	Rob Pronk, Traditional	2:59
7.	"Die Antwort weiß ganz allein der Wind"	Bob Dylan	3:56
8.	"In Den Kasernen"	Hertha Koch, Philippe-Gérard	3:11
9.	"Und wenn er wiederkommt"	Maurice Maeterlinck, Max Colpet, Gérard	3:01
10.	"Auf der Mundharmonika"	Mischa Spoliansky, Robert Gilbert	2:28

Side E – Marlene Dietrich's Berlin
No.	Title	Writer(s)	Length
1.	"Solang noch Unter'n Linden"	Hermann Haller, Rideamus, Walter Kollo, Willi Wolff	1:32
2.	"Du hast ja keine Ahnung wie schön du bist, Berlin"	Alfred Schönfeld, Jean Gilbert, Joseph Königsberger, Robert Gilbert	1:05
3.	"Durch Berlin fließt immer noch die Spree"	Gilbert, Königsberger, Gilbert	2:25
4.	"Mit dir, mit dir, da möcht ich Sonntags angeln gehn"	Haller, Rideamus, Kollo, Wolff	2:51
5.	"Nach meine Beene ist ja ganz Berlin verrückt"	S. W. Hardt, Kollo	3:36
6.	"Ja, das haben die Mädchen so gerne"	Schönfeld, Gilbert, Königsberger	3:14
7.	"Lieber Leierkastenmann"	Kollo	3:41

Side F – Marlene Dietrich's Berlin
No.	Title	Writer(s)	Length
8.	"Das war in Schöneberg"	Rudolf Bernauer, Rudolph Schanzer, Kollo	2:35
9.	"Untern Linden - Untern Linden"	Bernauer, Schanzer, Kollo	2:15
10.	"Das Zillelied (Das war sein Milljöh)"	Hans Pflanzer, Willi Kollo	2:19
11.	"Wenn du einmal eine Braut hast"	Erich Urban, Hugo Hirsch, Max Heye	2:05
12.	"Wo hast du denn die schönen blauen Augen her?"	Ralph Erwin, Robert Katscher	2:48
13.	"Berlin - Berlin (Das ist Berlin wie's weint, das ist Berlin wie's lacht)"	Willi Kollo	2:29
14.	"Solang' noch Unter'n Linden"	Haller, Rideamus, Kollo, Wolff	1:34

== Personnel ==
Credits adapted from the box set The Magic of Marlene (Capitol, catalog no. DTCR-300).

- Arranged By – Bert Grund (tracks: E1-F7)
- Conductor – Bert Grund (tracks: E1-F7)
- Orchestra – The Orchestra Of Burt Bacharach* (tracks: A1-B5)

== See also ==
- Marlene Dietrich discography
