= Marlene Dietrich in Deutschland =

- Mythos Marlene Dietrich LP edition artwork

Compilation album by Marlene Dietrich
- Released: 1976
- Recorded: 1960–1964
- Genres: Traditional pop, cabaret
- Label: EMI

Marlene Dietrich chronology
The Best of Marlene Dietrich (1973)	Marlene Dietrich in Deutschland (1976)	Just a Gigolo (1979)

Marlene Dietrich in Deutschland, also issued as Mythos Marlene Dietrich, is a compilation album by German-American actress and singer Marlene Dietrich, released in 1976 by EMI. The record brings together material originally recorded in the 1960s and was later re-released in several countries with variations in title, cover artwork, and track listings.

The compilation combines two of Dietrich’s earlier albums and offers an overview of a later stage of her musical career, marked both by the continuation of her classic repertoire and by the inclusion of songs from more contemporary styles. The album was distributed in different European markets, appearing in editions with distinct cover designs and through a variety of distribution strategies, including record clubs and special catalog series.

Over the years, Mythos Marlene Dietrich has been reissued in multiple formats, including LP, cassette tape and compact disc (CD), in both complete and abridged editions. The album received generally favorable reviews and was nominated for the Deutscher Schallplattenpreis in 1979, in the Historical Recordings: Entertainment category.

== Album details ==
Marlene Dietrich in Deutschland is a double album that complete repackaging of two of Dietrich's previous albums from the 1960s: Wiedersehen mit Marlene (1960) and Die neue Marlene (1964). The context of the first mentioned album revolves around Marlene Dietrich's return to West Germany in 1960 for her first concert tour since leaving the country during the Nazi era. The tour generated a divided response: while she was warmly welcomed by figures such as Berlin Mayor Willy Brandt and attracted large audiences, she also faced hostile press coverage, bomb threats, and protesters chanting "Marlene Go Home!" Although regarded as an artistic triumph, the tour was a financial failure and left her emotionally shaken, leading her to vow never to return. In connection with this comeback, the album was released in 1960, marketed as a live recording. In fact, it consisted of studio sessions recorded in Germany that were later overdubbed with applause captured during the tour to simulate the atmosphere of a concert performance. The album included in Marlene Dietrich in Deutschland is the AMIGA version (Catalog no. 8 40 030) devoid of the artificial applause and speak introductions before the songs.

The second album, Die neue Marlene ("The New Marlene"), was recorded in London between 6 and 8 September 1964. Initially conceived under the title Sag mir wo die Blumen sind, the project featured nine songs, including several chansons that Dietrich had already performed in London, a new composition by Mischa Spoliansky titled "Auf der Mundharmonika", and her first Christmas song, "Der kleine trommelmann", a German adaptation of "The Little Drummer Boy". Unlike many of her earlier studio releases, most of the tracks were not arranged by Burt Bacharach, with whom she had frequently collaborated in the past. At Dietrich's request, the album was ultimately renamed Die neue Marlene, a decision which, according to her biographer David Bret, reflected both a shift in her artistic approach and her desire to present a refreshed image to the public.

By uniting these two distinct works, Marlene Dietrich in Deutschland presents a comprehensive 25-track overview of the artist's successful return to the German stage and her subsequent foray into international folk and protest songs. The album is combination of two key phases of Dietrich's later career. The first half of the compilation, drawn from Wiedersehen mit Marlene, captures the orchestral cabaret style of her legendary live performances, featuring classic film themes and pre-war German songs that defined her iconic persona. The second half, sourced from Die neue Marlene, showcases a significant artistic shift, highlighting Dietrich's interpretations of contemporary folk music, including German-language versions of songs by artists like Bob Dylan and Pete Seeger. Production credits for the compilation note the work of arrangers Burt Bacharach, Pronk, and Stott. The cover photograph was supplied by SPIEGEL-Verlag, with design handled by the Werbegruppe Kochlowski.

== Releases details ==
Marlene Dietrich in Deutschland was released in France in 1976 by EMI (catalog no. 2C 184-52.442). The edition featured a red cover with an illustration of Dietrich's face, the same artwork previously used for the singles of "Sag Mir Wo Die Blumen Sind" (Electrola, E 22 180). In 1978, the album was released in several European countries, particularly in Germany, under the title Mythos Marlene Dietrich. The artwork was completely redesigned, this time featuring a colorized still from the 1939's film Destry Rides Again in lilac tones with pink borders. This cover has since become the most frequently used in reissues of the album across various formats. The double LP was also distributed in Germany through the Hör Zu Exclusiv record club, featuring distinct matrix numbers and catalogue data (32 770 AB / 32771 AB, 134-32 770/71). Different pressings of the vinyl release have been identified, varying by the colour of the record label (yellow or red) and the printer noted on the back cover (Maack or 4P Nicolaus).

An abridged version was issued in Germany in 1979 by EMI Electrola (catalog no. 38 336 4). While the release retained the original cover artwork, the title was shortened to Marlene Dietrich, dropping the word "Mythos". The edition contained 15 tracks, compared to the 25 featured on the original release.

In its May 1, 1987 issue, Music Week listed a new import release from Italy on its New Releases chart. The entry was for a special edition of the album, released by EMI under catalog number 3C 054-46349. This version was a condensed release of the original LP, featuring 15 of the original 25 tracks. The cover art was also slightly modified from the standard edition of Mythos Marlene Dietrich, most notably with the inclusion of a new title: Lili Marleen. In 1988, Show Music reported that a condensed 16-track edition compact disc (CD) was released in Germany by EMI (catalog no. CDP 538-1 59860 2), with a total running time of 55:40.

In 1989, a new CD was released in Japan by EMI Odeon, under the title Marlene Dietrich (catalog number CP32-9030), as part of the "Best Now" series. According to Show Music this series was known for its superior pressings, faithful miniature replication of original artwork (including collectible obi strips) and thoughtfully curated tracklists. For this edition, only one track, "Wenn Ich Mir 'was Wünschen Dürfte", was omitted from the original listing, resulting in a running time of 74:02. The cover used for this edition is the same as the U.S. release of Wiedersehen mit Marlene (Capitol Records, T 10282), with minor alterations like the title, which was adapted to fit the Best Now series.

== Critical reception ==
Professional ratings
Review scores
Source	Rating
The Encyclopedia of Popular Music	3/5 stars

The album was cited in a review of the Cary CAD-805 amplifier in Stereophile, where critic Dick Olsher remarked that "it wasn't so much that Marlene Dietrich sounded so good, but that her expressiveness was so well facilitated".

== Awards ==
In 1979, Mythos Marlene Dietrich was nominated for the Deutscher Schallplattenpreis in the Historische Aufnahmen - Unterhaltung (Historical Recordings: Entertainment) category. The 1979 nomination list was determined by an eighty-member jury and included releases across 24 categories. The awards were announced by the Deutsche Phono-Akademie and presented on May 17 at the Hamburg Congress Center (CCH). Other nominees in the same category included Es kommt auf die Sekunde an by Johannes Heesters, Wenn ich vergnügt bin, muß ich singen by Peter Igelhoff, The Famous Duos by Louis Armstrong, Ella Fitzgerald, and Bing Crosby, and the winner Die Comedian Harmonists Story by the Comedian Harmonists.

Awards and nominations for Mythos Marlene Dietrich
Year	Award	Category	Result	Ref.
1979	Deutscher Schallplattenpreis	Historische Aufnahmen: Unterhaltung (Historical Recordings: Entertainment)	Nominated	

== Track listing ==
Side A – Wiedersehen mit Marlene
No.	Title	Writer(s)	Length
1.	"Ich bin von Kopf bis Fuß auf Liebe eingestellt"	Friedrich Hollaender	2:20
2.	"Ich Bin Die Fesche Lola"	Hollaender, Richard Rillo	1:33
3.	"Wer wird denn weinen"	Hugo Hirsch, Arthur Rebner	1:01
4.	"Mein Blondes Baby"	Fritz Rotter, Peter Kreuder	3:52
5.	"Peter"	Hollaender, Peter Kreuder	3:22
6.	"Allein in Einer Grossen Stadt"	Franz Wachsmann, Max Colpet, Kurt Gerhardt	3:55
7.	"Wenn Ich Mir 'Was Wunschen Dürfte"	Hollander	4:21

Side B – Wiedersehen mit Marlene
No.	Title	Writer(s)	Length
8.	"Johnny, wenn du Geburtstag hast"	Hollander	2:52
9.	"Marie - Marie"	Gilbert Becaud, Pierre Delanoe	4:32
10.	"Lili Marlene"	Norbert Schultze, Hans Leip	2:56
11.	"Ich weiß nicht, zu wem ich gehöre"	Hollaender, Robert Liebmann	2:25
12.	"Ich hab' noch einen Koffer in Berlin"	Ralph Maria Siegel, Aldo von Pinelli	3:01
13.	"Ein richtiger Mann (Kinder, heut abend)"	Hollaender	2:00

Side C – Die neue Marlene
No.	Title	Writer(s)	Length
1.	"Wenn die Soldaten"	Rob Pronk, Traditional	2:59
2.	"Die Antwort weiß ganz allein der Wind"	Bob Dylan	3:57
3.	"In Den Kasernen"	Hertha Koch, Philippe-Gérard	3:11
4.	"Und wenn er wiederkommt"	Maurice Maeterlinck, Max Colpet, Gérard	3:00
5.	"Sag mir, wo die Blumen sind"	Colpet, Pete Seeger	3:24
6.	"Auf der Mundharmonika"	Mischa Spoliansky, Robert Gilbert	2:27

Side D – Die neue Marlene
No.	Title	Writer(s)	Length
7.	"Der Trommelmann"	Harry Simeone, K.K. Davis, Henry Onoratir	2:41
8.	"Wenn der sommer wieder einzieht"	Dick Robertson, Frank Weldon, James Cavanaugh, Lothar Metzl	3:01
9.	"Ich werde dich lieben"	Bruce Welch, Marlene Dietrich	2:45
10.	"Paff, der Zauberdrachen"	Fred Oldörp, Leonard Lipton, Peter Yarrow	4:06
11.	"Sch, kleines Baby"	Arthur Siegel, Don Costa, Dietrich	2:30
12.	"Mutter, hast du mir vergeben"	Czesław Niemen, Jacek Grań, Dietrich	4:09

== Personnel ==
Credits adapted from the LP Mythos Marlene Dietrich (EMI Electrola, catalog no. 1C 134-32 770/71)

- Arranged by Burt Bacharach
- Cover [Coverfoto-Entwurf] – Spiegel-Verlag*
- Design [Coverdesign] – Werbegruppe Kochlowski
- Liner Notes by Dr. Stephan Pflicht
- Vocals by Marlene Dietrich

Notes

- A1-B6 aufgenommen: Berlin/Köln August 1960
- C1, C3, C4, C6, D1 to D3, D5 & D6 aufgenommen: London 6. - 8.9.1964
- C2 & D4 aufgenommen: London 1.11.1963
- C5 aufgenommen: Paris 12.5.1962

== See also ==
- Marlene Dietrich discography
