= The Magic of Marlene (1970 album) =

Compilation album by Marlene Dietrich
- Released: 1970
- Recorded: 1960–1965
- Genres: Traditional pop, folk
- Label: Odeon

Marlene Dietrich chronology
The Magic of Marlene (1969)	The Magic of Marlene (1970)	The Best of Marlene Dietrich (1973)

The Magic of Marlene (also issued as The Best of Marlene Dietrich and Die Besten Von Marlene Dietrich) is a compilation album by German-American singer and actress Marlene Dietrich, released in 1970 by Odeon Records as part of its Worldwide Series.

The collection compiles material from Dietrich's 1960s albums Wiedersehen mit Marlene (1960) and Die neue Marlene, both recorded during a period of artistic transition following her post-Hollywood career. It includes performances in German and English, blending elements of chanson, cabaret, and popular music. It also features the single "Where Have All the Flowers Gone?", a song written by Pete Seeger in 1955 and recorded by Dietrich under the direction of Norman Newell.

The Encyclopedia of Popular Music rated the compilation, titled in the book as The Best of Marlene Dietrich, with four stars.

== Album details ==
The Magic of Marlene combines songs from 1960s albums: Wiedersehen mit Marlene (1960), Die neue Marlene (titled only Marlene in the LP) (1964). The first album originated during Dietrich's emotionally charged 1960 return to West Germany, a tour marked by both public admiration and intense hostility. Despite artistic success, the tour's financial failure and personal toll led her to refuse future returns. Marketed as live, the album was actually studio recordings enhanced with overdubbed applause, though the reissue (and the present album) removed these effects. Recorded in London in 1964, Die neue Marlene (The New Marlene) introduced Dietrich's renewed artistic direction. Featuring chansons, a Christmas track, and a new Spoliansky composition, the album notably departed from her earlier collaborations with Burt Bacharach. Originally planned as Sag mir wo die Blumen sind, it was retitled to reflect her evolving public image and creative reinvention.

The single "Where Have All the Flowers Gone?" (His Master's Voice – POP 1379) is also featured, a folk song written by Pete Seeger in 1955, adapted from the Cossack folk tune "Koloda-Duda" and set to an Irish melody. The song was later honored with induction into the Grammy Hall of Fame in 2002. According to Billboard, Dietrich first recorded the piece in Englishin London in 1963 under Norman Newell's direction, though dissatisfied with the results, she subsequently re-recorded the vocals in Paris before the single's eventual Australian release in December 1965. Cash Box gave the single a “B” rating in its April 18, 1964 issue, while Record Mirror described it as a professional release, praising Burt Bacharach's delicate arrangement and Dietrich's gentle, effective interpretation of Seeger's song.

== Release ==
The album was released in 1970 by Odeon, as part of their "Worldwide Series" – a line of LPs dedicated to compilations by renowned artists. This series included similarly titled releases, such as The Magic of Theodorakis (catalogue no. PSCX 6399, 1E 062 ◦ 28498), The Magic of Edith Piaf (SCX 6401), and The Magic of Amalia Rodrigues (SCX 6407).

Despite the series' unified title, Dietrich's edition received distinct treatment in some markets: in the Netherlands (#6E 054-28498) and Denmark (#6E 054-28498), it was marketed as The Best of Marlene Dietrich, while in Greece it was incorporated into the Portrait of collection (#SCXG 13019) by Columbia Records, an EMI subsidiary. Later, in 1973, it was reissued in Netherlands with new cover and titled Die Besten Von Marlene Dietrich. In its February 26, 1977 issue, Billboard reported the release of the album in Norway.

== Reception ==
Professional ratings
Review scores
Source	Rating
The Encyclopedia of Popular Music	4/5 stars

Alan Street, the CBS's catalogue marketing manager, cited the project Worldwide Series as an unexpected success case: "A couple of years ago we did an album called Magic Moments [The Magic of series], available at mid-price and featuring many of the old favourites — we were staggered at its success." According to a 1985's Music Week report, the strong commercial performance of this mid-priced LP series validated the market's appetite for nostalgic re-releases and directly paved the way for the development of the next LP series.

== Track listing ==
Worldwide Series: The Magic of Marlene - side 1
No.	Title	Writer(s)	Original Album	Length
1.	"Ich bin von Kopf bis Fuß auf Liebe eingestellt"	Friedrich Hollaender	Wiedersehen mit Marlene
2.	"Wenn Die Soldaten"	Traditional (arr. by Bob Pronk)	Die neue Marlene
3.	"Mein Blondes Baby"	Peter Kreuder, Fritz Rotter	Wiedersehen mit Marlene
4.	"Paff, der Zauberdrachen" (Puff, The Magic Dragon)	Fred Oldörp, Leonard Lipton, Peter Yarrow	Die neue Marlene
5.	"Allein In Einer Grossen Stadt" (Alone)	Franz Wachsmann, Max Colpet, Kurt Gerhardt	Wiedersehen mit Marlene
6.	"Der Trommelmann" (The Little Drummer Boy)	Harry Simeone, K.K. Davis, Henry Onorati, Bernard Buschor	Die neue Marlene
7.	"Cherche La Rose"	H. Salvador, P. Rouzard	Marlène (EP)
8.	"Where Have All the Flowers Gone?"	Pete Seeger	45 RPM Single (1975, POP 1379)

Worldwide Series: The Magic of Marlene - side 2
No.	Title	Writer(s)	Original Album	Length
9.	"Ich Bin Die Fesche Lola" (Lola)	F. Hollaender, R. Liebmann	Wiedersehen mit Marlene
10.	"Die Antwort weiß ganz allein der Wind"	Bob Dylan, B. Brecht	Die neue Marlene
11.	"Jonny, Wenn Du Geburtstag Hast"	F. Hollaender	Wiedersehen mit Marlene
12.	"In Den Kasernen"	Gerard, Koch	Die neue Marlene
13.	"Ich Weiss Nicht Zu Wem Ich Gehöre"	F. Hollaender	Wiedersehen mit Marlene
14.	"Lili Marleen"	H. Leip, N. Schultze	Wiedersehen mit Marlene
15.	"Peter"	F. Hollaender, Ralph Nelson	Wiedersehen mit Marlene
16.	"Sag Mir Wo Die Blumen Sind"	P. Seeger, Max Colpet	Die neue Marlene

== Personnel ==
Credits adapted from the 1976's LP The Magic of Marlene (Capitol, catalog no. DTCR-300).

- Conductor – Burt Bacharach (tracks: A1, A3, A5, A7, A8, B1, B3, B5 to B8)
- Design [Cover] – Feref

== See also ==
- Marlene Dietrich discography
