= Marlene singt Berlin, Berlin =

Marlene Singt Berlin, Berlin

Studio album by Marlene Dietrich
- Released: 1965
- Recorded: 1964
- Genre: Traditional pop
- Length: 38:48
- Label: Polydor Records

Marlene Dietrich chronology
Die neue Marlene (1965)	Marlene Singt Berlin, Berlin (1965)	Dietrich in London (1965)

Marlene Singt Berlin, Berlin (official US title and subtitle: Marlene Dietrich's Berlin – Her Nostalgic Songs About the Grand Old City) is a studio album by German and American actress and singer Marlene Dietrich released in 1965 on Polydor Records label.

The sessions were held in Munich, with Dietrich as producer, Max Colpet as executive producer, and arrangements by Bert Grund. The album consists mostly of works by lesser-known German composers, and was intended as a tribute to Berlin, featuring orchestral and jazz accompaniments and reflecting the city's cultural identity closely tied to Dietrich's artistic image.

Billboard praised Dietrich's expressive voice, particularly on the more intimate tracks. However, the album received limited attention in Britain, as its release coincided with her previous album, which dominated public and media interest at the time.

== Production and recording ==
The album was produced in Munich, not in Paris or London, with Marlene Dietrich as producer, Max Colpet as executive producer, and Bert Grund responsible for the arrangements. Dietrich herself justified the choice of location by insisting that if she was to record fifteen songs devoted to Berlin, it was only natural to do so in Germany rather than abroad.

Recording sessions took place in August 1964 in Copenhagen. The album was recorded in August 1964 in Copenhagen. On August 7th, Dietrich recorded five tracks: "Wenn ein Maedel einen gern hat", "Durch Berlin fließt immer noch die Spree", "Wo steht denn das geschrieben", "Wo hast Du nur die blauen Augen her?", and "Lieber Leierkastenmann". The sound mix was handled by Gerd Henjes, and although the tapes were initially sent from Copenhagen to Paris, the Paris studio lacked adequate equipment, necessitating remixing in Hamburg and Berlin.

Writing about the production, David Bret noted that the list of songs prepared for Dietrich contained several errors. One track, "Alles tun auf diese Welt", had been mistakenly included by her secretary, Mrs. Colpet, even though Dietrich had never heard of it and was unable to perform it. Frustrated by the oversight, she reminded Bret that he should have been familiar with her repertoire. Dietrich also emphasized that she had intended to close the album with a comic Berlin number, "Nach meine Beene ist ja ganz Berlin verrückt", which she believed better captured the spirit of the recording.

Dietrich personally designed the original album cover. In the 1984 documentary Marlene, directed by Maximilian Schell, the singer stated that she considered Marlene Singt Berlin, Berlin to be both her favorite and best album.

== Release ==
Billboard magazine listed the album in its "New Releases" section of 8 October 1966, under "Capitol of the World," with the catalog numbers Capitol T 10443 and ST 10443 for Marlene Dietrich's Berlin.

In 1989, the album was released on compact disc (CD) for the first time by CBS as part of the CBS Family Shop series, under the Deutsches Gold collection, and titled Das War Mein Milljöh (CBS – 465451 2). This edition completely abandoned the album's original artwork, instead featuring a cropped photograph from the 1973 compilation The Best of Marlene Dietrich, released by Capitol Records. In 2006, DRG Records released the album on CD, restoring its original artwork and title.

== Critical reception ==
Professional ratings
Review scores
Source	Rating
The Encyclopedia of Popular Music	3/5 stars

In its review, Billboard placed Marlene Dietrich's Berlin in the "International Spotlight" section, describing the record as a sixteen-part love song dedicated to the singer's native city. The magazine emphasized Dietrich's unique and universal style, underlining the expressive qualities of her deep, throaty voice. According to the review, this vocal delivery was particularly moving in the more intimate and tender numbers, such as "Berlin-Berlin", "Das Zille-Lied", and "Solang nach Unter’n Linden", the latter serving both as the opening and closing piece of the album.

Peter Reilly, writing for Hi-Fi/Stereo Review, regarded the album as a work of limited appeal, recommending it only to listeners fluent in German and familiar with the Berlin dialect employed by Dietrich. He described the record as a strictly parochial collection of songs about Berlin, carrying strong nostalgic value for Berliners but offering little accessibility to an international audience. Although he praised the rendition of "Unter'n Linden", which reminded him of Dietrich in The Blue Angel, Reilly considered the lack of lyric translations an obstacle to wider appreciation. He also noted critically that the album marked the first time in his memory that a Dietrich release did not feature a picture or illustration of the artist on its cover. He assigned the album grades of "Special" for performance, and "Good" for both recording and stereo quality.

== Commercial performance ==
According to Billboard, by September 1965, "Marlene Dietrich's 'Berlin' looks like the hottest selling LP of the year in Germany".

Despite Dietrich's own enthusiasm, the record did not receive widespread recognition in Britain. According to David Bret the popularity of Dietrich in London (1965) overshadowed Marlene singt Berlin-Berlin, preventing it from reaching the same audience. The author wrote that only one track, "Solang noch Untern Linden", was already familiar to British listeners, as it had served as the theme for the cabaret series of Agnes Bernelle, broadcast by the BBC.

== Track listing ==
Marlene Singt Berlin, Berlin
No.	Title	Writer(s)	Length
1.	"Solang noch Unter'n Linden"	Hermann Haller / Rideamus / Walter Kollo / Willi Wolff	1:33
2.	"Du hast ja keine Ahnung wie schön du bist, Berlin"	Alfred Schönfeld / Jean Gilbert / Joseph Königsberger, Robert Gilbert	1:07
3.	"Durch Berlin fließt immer noch die Spree"	Gilbert / Königsberger / Gilbert	2:28
4.	"Mit dir, mit dir, da möcht ich Sonntags angeln gehn"	Haller / Rideamus / Kollo / Wolff	2:54
5.	"Nach meine Beene ist ja ganz Berlin verrückt"	S. W. Hardt / Kollo	3:38
6.	"Ja, das haben die Mädchen so gerne"	Schönfeld / Gilbert / Königsberger	3:16
7.	"Wenn ein Mädel einen Herrn hat"	Pordes-Milo / Haller / Kollo / Wolff	1:59
8.	"Lieber Leierkastenmann"	Kollo	3:44
9.	"Das war in Schöneberg"	Rudolf Bernauer / Rudolph Schanzer / Kollo	2:38
10.	"Untern Linden - Untern Linden"	Bernauer / Schanzer / Kollo	2:17
11.	"Das Zillelied (Das war sein Milljöh)"	Hans Pflanzer / Willi Kollo	2:21
12.	"Wenn du einmal eine Braut hast"	Erich Urban / Hugo Hirsch / Max Heye	2:07
13.	"Es gibt im Leben manches Mal Momente"	Walter Bromme / Will Steinberg	1:50
14.	"Wo hast du denn die schönen blauen Augen her?"	Ralph Erwin / Robert Katscher	2:49
15.	"Berlin - Berlin (Das ist Berlin wie's weint, das ist Berlin wie's lacht)"	Willi Kollo	2:30
16.	"Solang' noch Unter'n Linden"	Haller / Rideamus / Kollo / Wolff	1:37
Total length:			38:48

== Personnel ==
Credits adapted from Marlene Dietrich Singt Berlin Berlin (DRG Records, catalog no. DRG-CD-91495).

- Arranged By – Bert Grund
- Leader [Leitung Des Orchesters] – Bert Grund
- Sleeve Notes [January 1965] – Marlene Dietrich
