= Die neue Marlene =

Studio album by Marlene Dietrich
- Released: 1965
- Recorded: September 1964
- Genre: Traditional pop
- Length: 38:13
- Label: Electrola

Marlene Dietrich chronology
Wiedersehen mit Marlene (1960)	Die neue Marlene (1965)	Marlene singt Berlin, Berlin (1965)

Singles from Die neue Marlene
- 1. "Sag mir, wo die Blumen sind" Released: 1962; 2. "Die Antwort Weiß Ganz Allein Der Wind" Released: 1964

Die neue Marlene is a studio album by Marlene Dietrich, released by Electrola in 1965. It was issued in the United Kingdom on His Master's Voice and released in the United States by Capitol Records under the title Marlene — Songs in German by the Inimitable Dietrich. Recorded in London, the project marked a departure from her previous work, featuring a repertoire of German-language songs that included folk adaptations like "Sag mir, wo die Blumen sind" and new material such as her first Christmas song.

The album was largely arranged without her frequent collaborator Burt Bacharach. Dietrich criticized the album's artwork and credits; despite requesting its withdrawal, only a revised version was released. Critical reception for the album was generally positive. Commercially, it achieved moderate success, peaking at number 34 on the German charts and remaining listed for two weeks.

== Production and recording ==
In September 1964, Marlene Dietrich traveled to London to record nine songs for a new album initially titled Sag mir wo die Blumen sind. The album was recorded between 6 and 8 September 1964 in London. The repertoire included several chansons she had already performed in London, a new composition by Mischa Spoliansky titled "Auf der Mundharmonika", and her first Christmas song, "Der kleine trommelmann", a German adaptation of "The Little Drummer Boy". Unlike her earlier studio releases, most of these tracks were not arranged by Burt Bacharach, with whom she had frequently collaborated in the past. At the last minute, Dietrich requested that the project be renamed Die neue Marlene (The New Marlene). According to her biographer David Bret, the decision reflected the changes in her artistic approach at the time, as well as her wish to present a refreshed image to the public.

The recording sessions in London also coincided with Dietrich's engagement at the Queen's Theatre, which opened on 23 November 1964. This was her last major season with Burt Bacharach as accompanist and conductor. The final concert of the run, on 12 December 1964, was recorded and later issued as the live album Dietrich in London, distinct from the studio project Die neue Marlene.

== Release and artwork ==
Electrola, Dietrich's German record label, was accused of "unchivalrous conduct" in its promotion of her new album Die neue Marlene. The label sparked controversy by launching the album with the bold statement: "Marlene Dietrich has just turned 60 years old", suggesting that the album aimed to prove that "for Marlene, life begins at 60". The US edition was listed in Billboard's monthly "New Releases" schedule, appearing in the issue dated June 12, 1965.

After its release, Dietrich expressed dissatisfaction with the first edition of the record and requested that it be withdrawn from the market due to several errors on the back cover. Among the mistakes were missing or incorrect songwriting credits, the title of "Sch, kleines Baby" printed as "Scht, kleines Baby", and "Mutter, hast du mir vergeben?" printed as "Mutter, kannst du mir vergeben?". The singer also criticized the artwork. She disliked the cover painting, describing it as resembling a "Dragon Lady", and objected to the use of a signed photograph of Ernest Hemingway on the back cover. She was angered that the essay Marlene Dietrich has three D's was attributed to Cecil Beaton instead of its actual author Kenneth Tynan. Additionally, she claimed ownership of the photographs reproduced on the back cover and stated that they were used without her permission, and also contested the misidentification of a uniform as being designed by Christian Dior. Electrola later modified the back cover, correcting the song credits and replacing the imagery with a still from The Monte Carlo Story, although Dietrich again voiced disapproval. However, she did not hold the contractual right of final approval over the sleeve design.

== Singles ==
The single "Sag Mir, Wo Die Blumen Sind" was released in 1962. The UK music weekly Record Mirror published a highly favourable review. It praised Dietrich's performance, noting that while she delivered it in her "curious, staccato style", she nonetheless managed to extract "the maximum warmth and emotion" from the song. The reviewer predicted it might not be a "noticeably big seller" but highly recommended it for her fans. It entered the German singles chart on November 1st of that year, reaching a peak position of number 20 and remaining on the chart for eight weeks. The song also charted internationally, peaking at number 10 in the Netherlands for a four-week run and reaching number 2 in Denmark. According to Billboard, it was the first time since Marlene's Blue Angel records that she has had record sales like these in Germany. Dietrich was awarded the "Golden Edison Prize" in Holland for the best record of the year.

The single "Die Antwort Weiß Ganz Allein Der Wind" entered the German singles chart on January 1st, 1964. It reached a peak position of number 32 and remained on the chart for one week. The song "Sag mir, wo die Blumen sind" was its B-side.

== Critical reception ==
Professional ratings
Review scores
Source	Rating
The Encyclopedia of Popular Music	3/5 stars
Record Mirror	3/5 stars

Billboard wrote that, despite being entirely in German, Marlene Dietrich "puts the lyric message across in her warm, intimate and distinctive vocal stylings", adding that she "is compelling and exciting throughout". Cash Box praised the album, stating that Marlene Dietrich "has come up with one of her best recorded outings thus far", highlighting its "refreshing musical session" and noting tracks such as "Puff the Magic Dragon" among the best.

The Age observed that while Marlene Dietrich had "swiftly come and gone", her music lived on through her recordings, and compared the album to Dietrich in London, stating that De neu Marlene was "the more interesting of the two releases for purely artistic reasons". The Glasgow Herald praised the album, remarking that "there never was such a thing as an old Marlene". The critic highlighted the album's twelve German-language songs, describing them as a blend of softness and her characteristic "magical guttural" tone. Performances of "Ein Mann ist ein Mann", "Puff, the Magic Dragon", and a German version of Bob Dylan's "Blowin' in the Wind" were singled out as "totally captivating".

== Commercial performance ==
The album entered the German album chart on April 15th, 1965, and reached a peak position of number 34. It remained on the chart for a total of two weeks.

== Track listing ==
Side one
No.	Title	Writer(s)	Length
1.	"Wenn die Soldaten"	Rob Pronk / Traditional	2:59
2.	"Die Antwort weiß ganz allein der Wind"	Bob Dylan	3:56
3.	"In Den Kasernen"	Hertha Koch / Philippe-Gérard	3:11
4.	"Und wenn er wiederkommt"	Maurice Maeterlinck / Max Colpet / Gérard	3:01
5.	"Sag mir, wo die Blumen sind"	Colpet / Pete Seeger	3:34
6.	"Auf der Mundharmonika"	Mischa Spoliansky / Robert Gilbert	2:28
Total length:			19:09

Side two
No.	Title	Writer(s)	Length
7.	"Der Trommelmann"	Harry Simeone / K.K. Davis / Henry Onoratir	2:41
8.	"Wenn der sommer wieder einzieht"	Dick Robertson / Frank Weldon / James Cavanaugh / Lothar Metzl	3:02
9.	"Ich werde dich lieben"	Bruce Welch / Marlene Dietrich	2:46
10.	"Paff, der Zauberdrachen"	Fred Oldörp / Leonard Lipton / Peter Yarrow	4:06
11.	"Sch, kleines Baby"	Arthur Siegel / Don Costa / Dietrich	2:29
12.	"Mutter, hast du mir vergeben"	Czesław Niemen / Jacek Grań / Dietrich	4:00
Total length:			19:04

== Personnel ==
Credits adapted from AllMusic.

- Arthur Siegel – arranger
- Bob Dylan – composer
- Bruce Welch – composer
- Burt Bacharach – conductor, producer, recording arranger
- Czesław Niemen – composer
- Dick Robertson – composer
- Domenick Costa – arranger
- Eric Rogers – conductor, recording arranger
- Frank Weldon – composer
- Hans Bradtke – translation
- Harry Simeone – arranger
- Henry Onorati – arranger
- James Cavanaugh – composer
- Katherine Davis – arranger
- Leonard Lipton – composer
- Marlene Dietrich – primary artist, vocals
- Mischa Spoliansky – composer
- Otto Demler – producer
- Pete Seeger – composer
- Peter Yarrow – composer
- Philippe Gérard – composer
- Rob Pronk – arranger, conductor, recording arranger
- Traditional – composer
- Wally Stott – conductor, recording arranger

== Charts ==
Weekly chart for Die neue Marlene
Chart (1965)	Peak position
German Albums (Offizielle Top 100)	34

== See also ==
- Marlene Dietrich discography
