= The Magic of Marlene =

The Magic of Marlene may refer to:

- The Magic of Marlene (1969 album), a box set by Marlene Dietrich
- The Magic of Marlene (1970 album), a compilation album by Marlene Dietrich
