= The Best of Marlene Dietrich =

Compilation album by Marlene Dietrich
- Released: 1973
- Recorded: 1954–1964
- Genre: Traditional pop, cabaret
- Label: Columbia

Marlene Dietrich chronology
The Magic of Marlene (1970)	The Best of Marlene Dietrich (1973)	Marlene Dietrich in Deutschland (1976)

The Best of Marlene Dietrich (released in the UK as The Fabulous Marlene Dietrich) is a compilation album by German-American singer and actress Marlene Dietrich, released in 1973 by Columbia Records. It features selections from some of her previous live albums, highlighting performances in both English and German.

The album was promoted to coincide with Dietrich's live shows in Toronto and released in the UK with alternative cover art by British budget label Hallmark Records.

In 1992, it was included with Alexander Liberman's book Marlene Dietrich: An Intimate Photographic Memoir. Critics praised the sound quality and repertoire, noting highlights such as Noël Coward's introduction and the distinctive arrangement of "Go 'Way from My Window".

== Album details ==
The track listing of The Best of Marlene Dietrich brings together songs from two of Dietrich's previous live albums released in the 1950s and 1960s: At the Café de Paris (1954) and Dietrich in London (1965). The context of the first mentioned album revolves around the 1954 Dietrich's residency at the famous London nightclub. The original album captures performances in both English and German, with musical arrangements led by conductor George Smith and introduced by Noël Coward. The second, Dietrich in London, documented a concert performance at the Queen's Theatre in London during the 1960s. London's original LP features a selection of songs from her stage repertoire, including popular standards and contemporary folk pieces, and the recording captures aspects of her theatrical presentation and stage presence, preserving key moments from the performance.

== Release and promotion ==
According to the September 22, 1973 issue of RPM magazine Columbia Records planned a major promotional campaign for the album's release later that year, strategically timed to coincide with the artist's engagement at Toronto's Imperial Room in the Royal York Hotel from November 28 to December 1. The label aimed to capitalize on the excitement surrounding her live performances to boost album sales, while another Columbia artist, David Bromberg, was scheduled to perform concurrently at the city's famed Riverboat club.

The album was released in 1973 in the UK as The Fabulous Marlene Dietrich by Hallmark Records (catalog no. SHM 834) with alternative cover art.

Alexander Liberman's 1992 book Marlene Dietrich: An Intimate Photographic Memoir not only brings together photographs taken by the author, a close friend of the actress, and familiar and personal images, but also included the compact disc (CD) The Best of Marlene Dietrich, catalog number CK 53015, issued by Columbia and Legacy Recordings. The idea of including a free CD came from Harry Evans of Random House. Chicago Tribune critic John McDonough noted that the book's accompanying CD included a 1954 London concert originally released by Columbia, but lamented that it contained none of the recordings from Dietrich's Weimar Berlin period, which the label also had access to.

== Critical reception ==
Professional ratings
Review scores
Source	Rating
AllMusic	4/5 stars
The Encyclopedia of Popular Music	4/5 stars

According to Bruce Eder of AllMusic, the compilation was considered successful in its mixing of stereo and mono tracks, with a repertoire spanning decades of the artist's career. He noted that the introduction by Noël Coward was "almost worth the price of admission" by itself and highlighted the track "Go 'Way from My Window" in particular for its "singular" and "folk-like" arrangement, which differs from the rest of the collection. Eder also praised the overall sound quality, despite the technical processes used, and concluded that the only drawback was the album's length, suggesting that Columbia's catalog contained enough material for a "more comprehensive" collection.

== Track listing ==
The Best of Marlene Dietrich
No.	Title	Writer(s)	Original Album	Length
1.	"Introduction By Noël Coward" (Voice – Noël Coward)	Noël Coward	At the Café de Paris	1:45
2.	"The Boys in the Back Room"	Frank Loesser, Frederick Hollander	At the Café de Paris	1:37
3.	"The Laziest Gal In Town"	Cole Porter	At the Café de Paris	2:24
4.	"Lola"	F. Hollander	Dietrich in London	1:49
5.	"I Wish You Love"	Albert Beach, Charles Trenet	Dietrich in London	3:24
6.	"Jonny"	F. Hollander	At the Café de Paris	2:19
7.	"Lili Marlene"	Hans Leip, Norbert Schultze, Tommie Connor	Dietrich in London	3:38
8.	"Go 'Way From My Window"	John Jacob Niles	Dietrich in London	2:55
9.	"La Vie en rose"	Édith Piaf, Louiguy (Louis Guglielmi)	At the Café de Paris	2:39
10.	"Honeysuckle Rose"	Andy Razaf, Fats Waller	Dietrich in London	3:03
11.	"Falling in Love Again"	F. Hollander	Dietrich in London	2:13
Total length:				30:30

== Personnel ==
Credits adapted from the box set The Best of Marlene (Columbia, catalog no. C 32245).

- Marlene Dietrich – vocals
- Noël Coward – introduction, recitation

Production

- Cover design – Ed Lee & Karen Limnach
- Back cover photo – Culver Pictures
- Photo coloring – Marie Olive

== See also ==
- Marlene Dietrich discography
