= Die keusche Susanne =

Die keusche Susanne (Chaste Susanne) is an operetta in three acts by Jean Gilbert. The German libretto was by Georg Okonkowski, based on the 1906 play Le fils à papa by Antony Mars and Maurice Desvallières. Jean Gilbert's son, Robert Gilbert prepared a revised version in 1953. The title alludes to the biblical story of Susanna and the Elders.

== Performance history ==
It was first performed at the Wilhelm-Theater in Magdeburg on 26 February 1910. It was the composer's greatest success, enabling him to move to Berlin to become conductor of the Thalia-Theater.

Adapted into English, by Frederick Fenn and Arthur Wimperis, it was produced in London in 1912 as The Girl in the Taxi. Adapted back into French by Mars and Desvallières, it was produced in Paris and then Lyon in 1913 as La chaste Suzanne. The musical was adapted back into French by Mars and Desvallières and produced in Paris and then Lyon in 1913 as La chaste Suzanne. It was also staged in South America in Italian (La casta Susana), in Spanish (La chasta Suzanna), and Portuguese (Susana), among other languages. In France the work has continued to be produced into the twenty-first century (for instance in Calais in January 2004), and in 2017 a 1962 French radio performance was released in the form of digital downloads.

== Roles ==
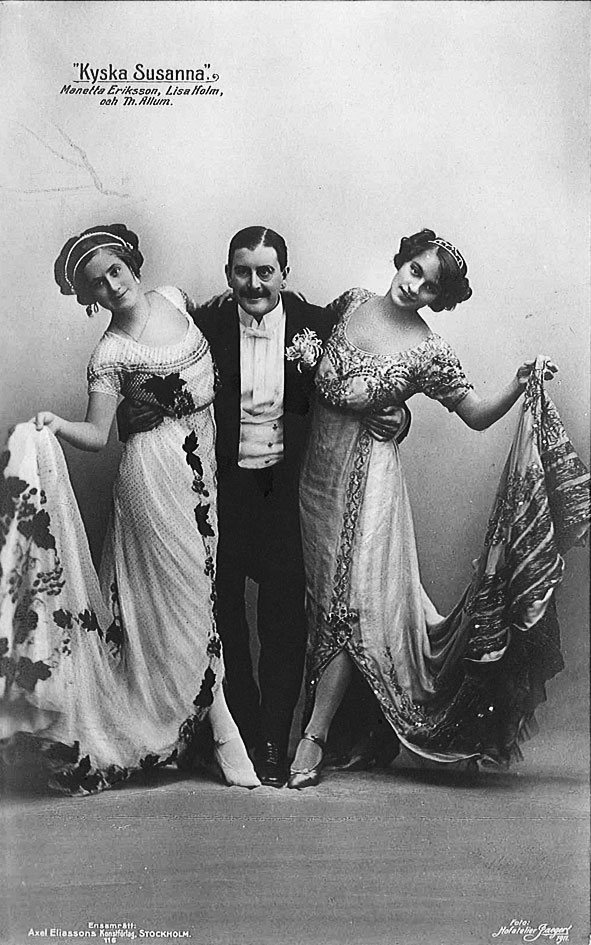
Three members of the cast of the first Swedish performance of Die keusche Susanne at the Oscarsteatern in Stockholm, 1911. Swedish actresses Manetta Eriksson (later Ryberg) and Lisa Holm are surrounding Norwegian baritone Thorleif Allum.

Roles, voice types, premiere cast
Role	Voice type	Premiere cast, 26 February 1910 Conductor: Jean Gilbert
Susanne Fleuron	soprano	
Fleuron, a parfumier, Susanne's husband	baritone	
René Wildhagen	tenor	
Baron Conrad von Felseneck	bass	
Clementine von Felseneck, his wife	contralto	
Pauline von Felseneck, their daughter	soprano	
Paul von Felseneck, their son	tenor	
Professor Hintzmeyer	baritone	
Frau Rosa, his wife	contralto	
Krause, head waiter at the Palais de Danse	baritone	
Policeman	baritone	
A servant	soprano	
Professors, students, police, ball guests etc.

Time and place: Berlin, about 1900

== Instrumentation ==
The work is scored for an orchestra consisting of 2 flutes, 2 oboes, 2 clarinets, 2 bassoons, 4 french horns, 3 trumpets, 3 trombones, 1 guitar, 1 celesta, 1 harp, percussion and strings.

== Films ==
A silent film version Chaste Susanne was made in 1926 by Richard Eichberg, starring Lilian Harvey, Willy Fritsch, Ruth Weyher, and Hans Wassmann. Novafilm Fernsehproduktion also made a version for television in 1972 directed by Thomas Engel with Maria Schell as Susanne.

A French-Spanish film production of the Spanish version La casta Susana (French: La chaste Suzanne) was made in 1963 by Luis César Amadori with Marujita Díaz, Carlos Estrada, Noël Roquevert and Chonette Laurent. 19 years before that, an Argentine film production of the same Spanish version was made in 1944 with Mirtha Legrand as Susana. The movie was directed by Benito Perojo and was aired in the early 90s by the Univision Cable Network in the USA.
