= Henry Winterfeld =

German writer and artist (1901–1990)

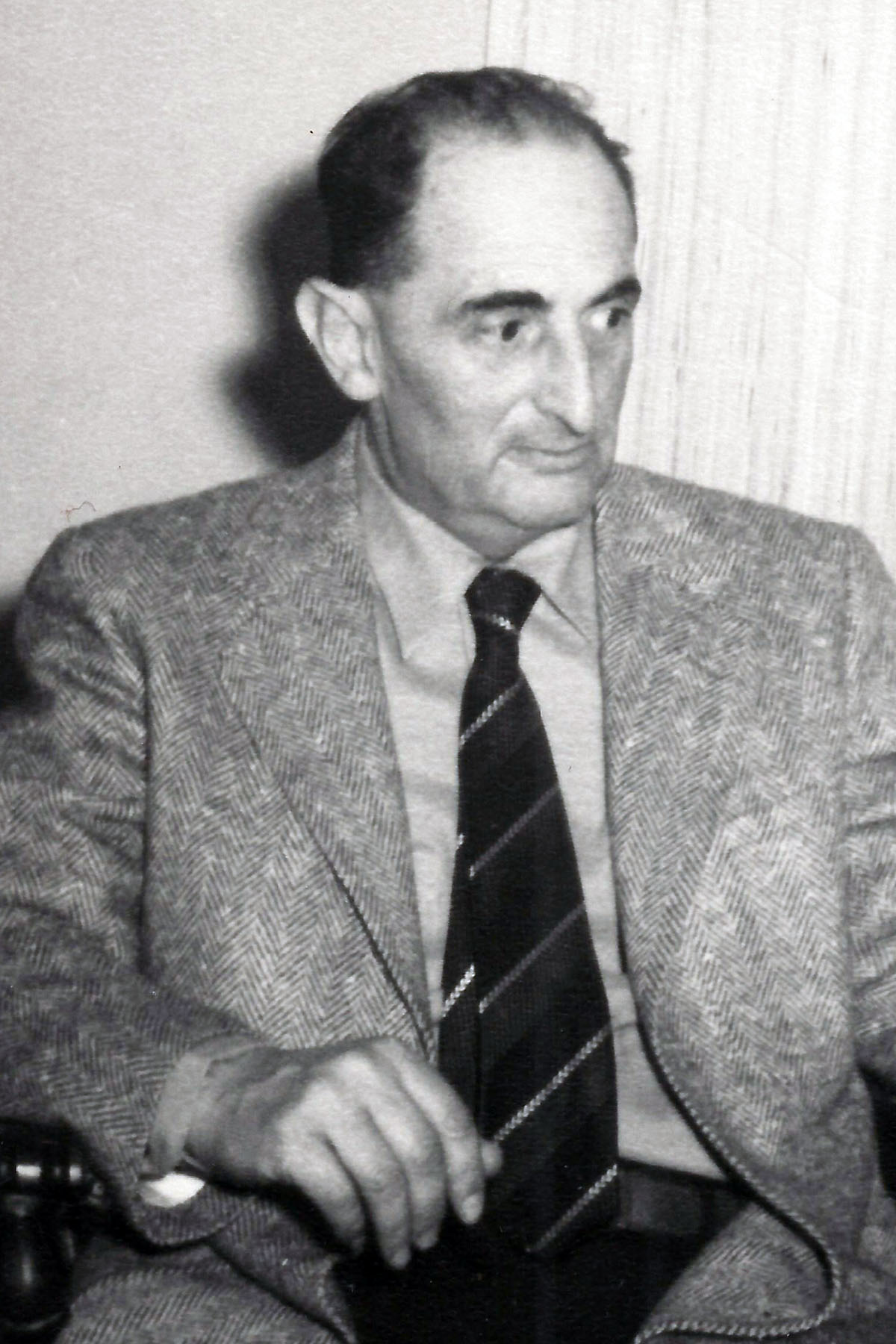
- Born: April 9, 1901; Hamburg, Germany
- Died: January 27, 1990 (aged 88); Machias, Maine, U.S.
- Citizenship: United States
- Occupations: Writer, artist
- Spouse: Elsie Winterfeld
- Children: Thomas Henry Winterfeld
- Relatives: Jean Gilbert (father); Robert Gilbert (brother)
- Writing career
- Pen name: Manfred Michael
- Language: German
- Period: 1937–1976
- Genres: Children, young adult

Henry Winterfeld (April 9, 1901 – January 27, 1990), published under the pseudonym Manfred Michael, was a German writer and artist famous for his children's and young adult novels. He emigrated to the U.S. in 1940 and lived there until his death.

Henry Winterfeld was married to Elsie Winterfeld, who was a designer of toys and created a patented three-faced doll.

== Biography ==
Henry Winterfeld began his career as a writer in 1933, when he wrote to entertain his son, Thomas Henry Winterfeld (1923–2008, an oceanographer), who was young and sick with scarlet fever. The result was Henry Winterfeld's first book, Trouble at Timpetill, which was published in 1937 in German under the pseudonym Manfred Michael.

He wrote many books aimed at children. These books have been translated into various languages. A couple have been made into videos, such as the movie Les enfants de Timpelbach (English: Trouble at Timpetill) (2008).

Because of the Nazi regime in Germany, Henry Winterfeld, who was a Jew, moved to Austria in 1933 and from there emigrated to France in 1938. In October, 1939, he was arrested and interned in Nevers until he was able to emigrate to the United States before the German invasion of France began on May 10, 1940. In 1946, he became an American citizen. Winterfeld's niece, Marianne Gilbert Finnegan, describes the life of the Winterfelds in the United States in her autobiography Memories of a Mischling: Becoming an American.

== Bibliography ==
- Timpetill – Die Stadt ohne Eltern (1937), translated as Trouble at Timpetill (1963)
- Caius ist ein Dummkopf (1953), translated as Detectives in Togas (1956)
- Kommt ein Mädchen geflogen (1956), translated as Star Girl (1957)
- Telegramm aus Liliput (1957), translated as Castaways in Lilliput (1958)
- Pimmi Pferdeschwanz (1967)
- Caius geht ein Licht auf (1969), translated as Mystery of the Roman Ransom
- Der Letzte der Sekundaner (1971)
- Caius in der Klemme (1976)
