= The Tale of Custard the Dragon =

Children's poem by Ogden Nash

- by Ogden Nash
- Genre: poem for children

The Tale of Custard the Dragon is a poem written by Ogden Nash. A picture book of the 1936 poem with illustrations by Lynn M. Munsinger was published in 1995.

The poem has been described as "probably his most famous poem for kids". In 1959, it inspired Leonard Lipton to write a poem that evolved into the song "Puff, the Magic Dragon". This poem is written as a ballad which presents a short story with parody.

== Synopsis ==
The poem opens with the introduction of Belinda and her company of pets: Ink (the kitten), Blink (the mouse), Mustard (the dog) and Custard (the cowardly dragon). Everyone is fond of bragging and boasting about their bravery, except Custard. Despite his frightening looks, the dragon cries for a nice safe cage and gets tickled mercilessly. His inmates take it for granted that he is a coward and makes him the butt of ridicule, calling him Percival. The poem has an ironic tone, as the fierce-looking dragon is weak and scared—unlike threatening storybook dragons.

Suddenly, a pirate holding pistols breaks into the house. Panic-stricken, everyone flees except Custard, who chases the pirate and devours him, proving himself the bravest of all. The others now feel obliged to him. Once the danger is over, however, everyone resumes blowing his own horn, while Custard keeps asking for a nice safe cage.
