= The Legendary Marlene Dietrich =

Compilation album by Marlene Dietrich
- Released: 1967
- Recorded: 1928–1931
- Genre: Traditional pop, cabaret
- Label: Music For Pleasure

Marlene Dietrich chronology
Dietrich in London (1965)	The Legendary Marlene Dietrich (1967)	The Magic of Marlene (1969)

The Legendary Marlene Dietrich, also issued as Marlene and Falling in Love Again, is a compilation album by German-American actress and singer Marlene Dietrich, released in 1967 by Music For Pleasure (MFP). It features ten recordings made by Dietrich between 1928 and 1931, originally issued as singles. These tracks made their first appearance on LP format with this compilation, offering a comprehensive overview of her early career.

Notable tracks include the duet "Wenn die beste Freundin" with Margo Lion, a cabaret number with lesbian-themed content, as well as songs recorded for the film The Blue Angel (1930). The compilation highlights Dietrich's contributions to cabaret and early cinematic music, capturing the unique style and expressive range that would define her career.

The album received positive critical attention, with The Encyclopedia of Popular Music rating it four stars. It was cited by Elseviers Magazine in 1982 for the enduring quality of Dietrich's recordings, contrasting them with contemporary reinterpretations that lacked the original's mystical vocal presence.

== Album details ==
The Legendary Marlene Dietrich compiles ten recordings made by Dietrich between 1928 and 1931, originally released as singles. This was the first time these songs appeared on LP format, providing listeners with a comprehensive record of the artist's early career. The recording and release details of the tracks are as follows:

The track "Wenn die beste Freundin", a duet with Margo Lion featuring Oskar Karlweis and Mischa Spoliansky on piano, was the first to be recorded, with its sessions taking place in June 1928. It was released by Electrola under catalog number EG-892. The song became a smash hit in Germany, and is considered the first, or at least the best-preserved, example of a cabaret number with lesbian-themed content. Written by Marcellus Schiffer and Mischa Spoliansky for the revue Es liegt in der Luft, the lyrics ostensibly depict two women on a shopping trip who are dissatisfied with their husbands and suggest sharing a very intimate relationship with each other, going beyond simple friendship. The song was performed by Dietrich at the Komödie theatre, after her training at Max Reinhardt's drama school in Berlin. In her autobiography, she recalls suggesting attaching violets to the shoulders of their dresses during the performance, unaware of the gesture's lesbian coding, and being surprised when a review described her performance as "androgynous".

The remaining tracks mostly originate from two studio sessions concentrated in the early months of 1930 and 1931. In January 1930, Dietrich recorded for the film The Blue Angel (1930) the songs "Falling in Love Again" (in English) and "Blonde Women" (the English version of "Nimm dich in acht vor blonden Frau'n"), which were released together as a two-sided single by His Master's Voice (B 3524). The February 1930 session produced a series of her German classics: "Ich bin die fesche Lola" (Electrola EG 1802), "Kinder, heut' abend such' ich mir was aus" (whose English version, "This Evening Children", was recorded at the same time and included in this compilation, but only released in 1958) and "Ich Bin Von Kopf Bis Fuss Auf Liebe Eingestellt" (Electrola EG 1770). The song "Wenn ich mir was wünschen dürfte", also from February 1930, was released by Electrola with number 2265. In March 1931, Dietrich returned to the studio for a series of recordings that complete the album. From this session, there are "Quand l'amour meurt" (Electrola EG 2775), "Leben ohne Liebe kannst du nicht" (Electrola EG 2285), and "Give Me the Man", a song written for the film Morocco (1930) that was not used in its full form.

== Release ==
The album was originally released in the United Kingdom by Music For Pleasure (MFP 1172) in 1967, with the subtitle: "Songs from the Classic Films The Blue Angel and Morocco with Other Unforgettable 1928-31 Recordings". It was later reissued by Stanyan Records in the United States (SR 10124) and Australia (L-25,230) in 1975, featuring a new cover. In 1979, the label Band released the album in Brazil as part of the "Os Mitos" series under the title Os Mitos: Marlene Dietrich (BR 23.032), using the same cover as the U.S. and Australian editions. Finally, the album was re-released in the United Kingdom under the title Falling in Love Again, this time with a new cover showing Marlene Dietrich in the 1960s.

== Critical reception ==
Professional ratings
Review scores
Source	Rating
The Encyclopedia of Popular Music	4/5 stars

The album Marlene, released by Stanyan Records (SR 10124), was specifically cited by Elseviers Magazine on January 23, 1982, in the context of a review of the soundtrack for Rainer Werner Fassbinder's film Lola. The article drew a comparison between Fassbinder's use of songs from Marlene Dietrich's repertoire—performed in this case by his "nightclub singer" Barbara Sukowa—and Dietrich's own recordings, noting that Sukowa did not reach the mystical quality of Dietrich's voice in The Blue Angel. The review also recalled that Peer Raben, Fassbinder's longtime collaborator, had already composed around fifty soundtracks, and stressed that while the tracks in Lola worked within the cinematic narrative, when heard separately they rarely stood out as memorable scores. In contrast, the critic pointed out the enduring and timeless impact of Dietrich's recordings, exemplified by the Marlene album itself.

== Track listing ==
Side A
No.	Title	Writer(s)	Length
1.	"Falling in Love Again"	Holländer, Connelly	3:10
2.	"Blonde Women"	Holländer	3:16
3.	"Lola"	Holländer	2:30
4.	"This Evening, Children"	Holländer	2:35
5.	"Wenn Die Beste Freundin"	Schiffer, Spoliansky	3:05

Side B
No.	Title	Writer(s)	Length
1.	"Give Me The Man"	Hajos, Robin	3:03
2.	"Quand L'Amour Meurt"	Cremieux	3:06
3.	"Wenn Ich Mir 'Was Wünschen Dürfte'"	Holländer	1:52
4.	"Leben Ohne Liebe Kannst Du Nicht"	Spoliansky, Gilbert	3:02
5.	"Ich Bin Von Kopf Bis Fuss Auf Liebe Eingestellt"	Holländer	2:56

== Personnel ==
Credits adapted from the 1967 LP The Legendary Marlene (Music For Pleasure – MFP 1172).

- Marlene Dietrich – vocals
- Susan Kampers – performance credit ("Wenn die beste Freundin")
- Noël Henrick – liner notes

Credits adapted from the 1975 LP Marlene (Stanyan Records – L25230).

- Art Direction – Hy Fujita
- Liner Notes – Allen Odell
- Supervised By – Wade Alexander

== See also ==
- Marlene Dietrich discography
