= Detectives in Togas =

1956 book by Henry Winterfeld

- Book cover (2003)
- Author: Henry Winterfeld
- Original title: Caius ist ein Dummkopf
- Translator: Richard and Clara Winston
- Illustrator: Charlotte Kleinert
- Country: United States
- Language: English
- Genre: Children's literature
- Publisher: Harcourt Brace Jovanovich
- Published: 1956
- Media type: Print
- OCLC: 48846777
- Followed by: Mystery of the Roman Ransom; Caius in der Klemme

Detectives in Togas (original title: Caius ist ein Dummkopf; "Caius is an Idiot") is a children's book written by Henry Winterfeld, and translated from the German by Richard and Clara Winston. Set in ancient Rome, the story follows a group of schoolboys who try to solve several crimes: the attack on their teacher and the desecration of a temple wall.

Detectives in Togas was published in 1956, and reissued in 1984, 1990, and 2003. It was marketed for children ages 9–12. It was followed by two sequels: Caius geht ein Licht auf ("Caius has a Revelation"; English title: Mystery of the Roman Ransom) and Caius in der Klemme ("Caius is in Trouble").

== Synopsis ==
=== Detectives in Togas ===
During a Greek vocabulary class in the Xanthos School, Rufus plays a prank on Caius involving a wax tablet with the inscription "Caius is an idiot". Caius takes offense and starts a fight with Rufus, and Xantippus permanently dismisses Rufus from his school. When the pupils (sans Caius, who is skipping the day) arrive at the school the next morning, they find Xantippus locked inside his closet. Xantippus tells them that he was knocked out by a burglar the night before. He also admits that Rufus' dismissal was only meant to be a wholesome lesson and that he is welcome to return.

The boys head to inform Rufus about the good news when they discover the words "Caius is an idiot" painted on the wall of the local Minerva temple. Caius' sister Claudia warns them that her father has seen the graffiti and that Caius has implicated Rufus. The boys rush to Rufus to warn him. Rufus swears that he didn't commit the desecration and surmises that someone else must have forged his handwriting. The boys return to the Xanthos School to get the wax tablet, but find it missing. Instead, they discover a gold chain which Xantippus recognizes as the property of the burglar. On a billboard featuring the daily public news is a writ describing the desecration and blaming Rufus by name. The boys return to Rufus's house, but his mother tells them that Rufus has been arrested. As they search Rufus' room, they find his clothes thoroughly soaked.

The boys decide to consult Lukos, a famed seer who lives across the Xanthos School. They present the gold chain so Lukos can find out the burglar's identity, but they are inexplicably chased out, leaving the chain behind. Mucius, who finds Rufus' cloak inside Lukos's house, is accidentally locked in, but finds an escape via a ladder to the roof. Blinded by a storm, Mucius ends up falling through an opening in the roof of a neighboring bathhouse and lands in a pool that is being drained for the night, which saves his life. Locked inside the building, he is found by a bath keeper the next morning and learns that Rufus had also landed in the same bath the previous night.

Xantippus realizes that the writ on the billboard was handed in for publication before the temple wall was desecrated, and sends the boys out to make inquiries. They learn that the writ was handed in by Tellus, a famous ex-consul known for his lavish parties. Xantippus suspects that one of Tellus' guests must have committed the sacrilege, and Antonius is sent to Tellus under a pretense to study the guest list of that particular day. Arriving in the midst of a feast, Antonius is plied with alcohol by Tellus; but while giving his host the slip, he finds the gold chain and its accompanying cloak inside Tellus' bedroom, indicating a relationship between Tellus and Lukos.

Antonius spots Tellus sneaking into a bakery next to Lukos's house. The boys discover that the bakery's backyard offers entry to Lukos's abode. They sneak inside, but are trapped by Lukos, who confesses that he is responsible for the burglary in the school, the smearing of the temple wall, and Rufus' arrest because the boy had found out his most important secret. As he prepares to lock them up, the boys attack him and knock him out, and discover that Lukos is Tellus in disguise.

When Tellus recovers consciousness, he confesses that he posed as a clairvoyant to pay off the massive debts he had accumulated due to his costly lifestyle. Rufus had sought Lukos out to charm Xanthos into forgetting about his dismissal, but discovered his true identity. When Tellus threatened him, Rufus fled and ended up in the bathhouse. Tellus decided to silence him by stealing the wax tablet and using it as a stencil. He also sent the writ to the Censor's office and reported him to the urban prefect.

The boys force Tellus to write a confession, but then he flees up the ladder to the roof just as Vinicius, Xantippus and a group of praetorians arrive to rescue them. The party tracks Tellus to the bathhouse, where they find him dead after a fatal plunge into an already drained pool, and Rufus is freed in the nick of time.

=== Mystery of the Roman Ransom ===
Xantippus' students offer their teacher a birthday gift of a deaf-mute slave named Udo, and Antonius offers him a tame lion to guard the school. Xantippus refuses both offers, and asks the boys to return Udo to his former owner, the slave trader Callon. When they arrive, an old slave tells them that Callon fled after he was threatened by an ex-gladiator named Gorgon seeking Udo. The boys then run into Gorgon, who tries to abduct Udo, but the boys escape and retreat with Udo to their secret cave.

Udo reveals that he only pretended to be deaf and dumb to protect his life. Udo was the personal slave of Marcius Patricius Pollino, a governor in Germania. His master sent him to Rome with an important message, but when he arrived, he found the meeting point to be a graveyard. Udo hid and overheard the conversation between Gorgon and a short, fat man. Udo learned that the letter contained instructions for Gorgon to murder an important Roman senator and to kill Udo. As Udo fled the graveyard, he lost the letter and ran into a band of gladiators, who sold him to Callon.

When Xantippus arrives, the boys inform him about the plot, and Udo mentions that a stranger had frequently visited Pollino. The boys find the lost letter, a list of unrelated names. Caius realizes that these names, read in a certain way, form the name of Vinicius, his own father. Caius runs off to fetch Tiro, his father's secretary, and alert the urban prefect, Lucius Terrentius Manilius. Udo remembers that Manilius is the name of his master's visitor, and Xantippus sends the boys after Caius.

At the Villa Vinicius, Tiro tells the boys and Claudia that Caius was kidnapped by Gorgon. The boys deduce that Gorgon will likely meet with the fat man in the graveyard the next night. After spending the evening in the villa, the boys rush to the graveyard and eavesdrop on the conspirators. Mucius pursues the fat man, Antonius goes after Gorgon, and the remaining boys return to the school. Antonius later returns to tell them that he had followed Gorgon to the Colosseum and found Caius in one of the dungeon cells. However, he was captured by the gladiators, locked in a vault, and had a lion released on him. The lion was Ramses, the tame lion Antonius wanted to gift to Xantippus. After escaping the Colosseum together, Antonius brought Ramses to the school.

Xantippus and his pupils find that Udo has run away. Gorgon and Minimos, a dwarf gladiator, arrive at the school and demand Udo from them. When Rufus frees Ramses, Gorgon is overpowered and captured, while Minimos flees.

Mucius, following the fat man, discovers that this conspirator is Manilius. After a messenger delivers urgent news of Pollino's arrest by Vinicius to Manilius, the prefect and another conspirator, a barque's captain, decide to flee immediately. After being chased by the barque's crew, Mucius rejoins his friends at the school.

Caius appears, having been freed by Udo, and tells them that he learned that after the battle in the Teutoburg Forest, a handful of legionnaires had escaped the massacre and buried the annihilated legions' war chest, which contained over ten million sestertii in gold. Manilius, one of those legionnaires, recovered the gold with the help of his brother-in-law, Pollino. The Emperor learned of this and tasked Vinicius to recover the gold, but Pollino, who had hidden the gold, committed suicide shortly after his capture. For this failure, the Emperor has sentenced the entire Vinicius family to slavery in the marble quarries.

The boys rush to the villa to save the Vinicius family, only to find that the Emperor has already sent agents to arrest Vinicius. Xantippus arrives with Udo, who has returned after freeing the other captives at the Colosseum. From Udo's story, Xantippus has deduced that the gold is hidden in the cage of a brown bear Pollino had shipped to Rome, with the bear serving as its guardian. Mucius realizes that the cage with the bear has been loaded onto the barque, and Vinicius and the Imperial agents immediately set out to chase it down. Xantippus declares that he will secure Udo's release so he can return home to Gaul, and Caius thanks Udo for saving his life.

=== Caius Is in Trouble ===
One day, Caius does not appear in school. The other boys tell Xantippus that they last saw him two nights ago, when they went to fetch tickets at the Circus Maximus for a chariot race featuring the famed racer Ben Gor; however, the tickets were sold out. Caius declared that he would be able to get tickets and stormed off in a rage when the others laughed at him. Mucius saw Caius the next day, a holiday, with a mule and rope ladder.

The boys head for Villa Vinicius to look for Caius, but the villa's doorkeeper tells them that Caius is dead and being buried. The boys return to tell Xantippus, but then Quintus, a retired centurion who served under Vinicius, arrives with a package from Caius' sister Claudia. Xantippus discovers a secret message imploring him to seek out Ben Gor, the only person who could save Caius, who was sentenced to death by the Emperor and about to be executed. However, with the delayed delivery of the message due to the holiday, any help for Caius is now too late.

The next day, the boys return to Villa Vinicius, where Claudia tells them that she has no idea why Caius was executed, and that Ben Gor is a friend of the Vinicius family. Ben Gor is considered a national hero in Rome, leading the boys to believe that Caius must have somehow offended the Emperor while attempting to get spare tickets from Ben Gor. Claudia and the boys are shocked when they see Mopsa, Claudia's pet cat, alive after she had been used as a guinea pig for the poison which was administered to Caius. The boys quickly realize that if the poison did not work on Mopsa, Caius might still be alive, and they rush for the Vinicius mausoleum, where Caius's coffin has been stored. Inside the coffin, they find their friend alive but unable to stand up, so the boys ferry the coffin to the Xanthos School.

Caius reveals that after he had separated from the other boys that night, he went to Ben Gor to ask him for spare tickets. Ben didn't have any, but suggested that Caius should go to the Emperor to ask him for some. With the imperial palace closed for the holiday, Caius, obsessed with getting the tickets, rented a mule from a public stable and procured a rope ladder to climb over the palace walls. He succeeded, but was arrested and knocked out by two Praetorian guards before he could explain himself, and subsequently found himself accused of intending to assassinate the Emperor.

A group of Praetorians and an officer of the Emperor's secret police arrive and arrest the boys after it was discovered that Caius' coffin had been taken away. The boys are locked in a dungeon cell, but are visited by Ben Gor, who was alerted by Xantippus. Ben Gor tells the boys that he had explained everything to the Emperor, but the Emperor would only pardon Caius and his friends if Ben Gor wins the race. Ben Gor prevails and scores a triumphant victory, and the Emperor pardons Caius and his friends.

== Characters ==
Caius
The son of Vinicius, a very influential senator. Despite being the featured character in the German titulations, he habitually plays a more secondary role in the stories. He is somewhat slow-witted, stubborn and has a very short temper, and tends to inadvertently plunge his friends into deep trouble (thereby forming the base of their adventures).
Xanthos/"Xantippus"
A Greek scholar who has opened a private school for the sons of wealthy patricians in the heart of Rome. Because of his stern and critical manner, his pupils have given him the nickname "Xantippus", based on Xanthippe, the wife of Socrates. However, whenever the boys get involved in dangerous adventures, he is a ready and very valuable source of knowledge and experience.
Mucius
The oldest of Xanthos' pupils, and as the most level-headed, also the leader of their band. His father is a famous tribune named Marius Domitius.
Rufus
The son of Marcus Praetonius, a famous general of modest wealth. He has an open crush on Caius' sister Claudia.
Antonius
The son of a senator. He is the most adventurous and imaginative of the boys, eager to dream up fanciful confrontations with all sorts of villains, monsters and other dangerous enemies.
Flavius
A senator's son. He is the most cowardly of the boys, but also extremely faithful to his friends and always tags along on their exploits.
Julius
The son of a senator and judge, and therefore quite knowledgeable about Roman law. As the most frugal of the boys, he is also their treasurer.
Publius
Son of a senator, and the group's most vociferous complainer who regularly tangles with Caius.
Claudia
Caius' younger sister. Despite her tender years (11–13, as the series progresses), she has assumed the role of the Vinicius household's matron upon her mother's death.
Senator Vinicius
Caius and Claudia's father, and a high-ranking member of the Roman Senate. He is occasionally entrusted with confidential missions by the Emperor.

== Reception ==
In the journal Elementary English, the reviewer calls it a "rousing detective story" and notes that Winterfeld was inspired by actual graffiti found during the excavation of Pompeii. The journal The Classical World says Detectives in Togas is a "simple and lively story". A reviewer in the library journal Collection Management says it "adds life to the study of ancient civilizations".

The Christian Science Monitor says Detective in Togas "neatly succeeds in constructing a lesson in ancient history around the plot of a whodunit and spinning the whole thing into a great tale for middle school readers". A reviewer in Huntingdon Daily News says the book has a "fascinating setting", and is "full of suspense and excitement".

Kirkus Reviews describes it as "A good story and with its careful attention to Roman ways, this has its sparkle too" and Publishers Weekly calls it "delightful and witty". For the 2003 reissue, reviewer Terri Schmitz says it is "action-packed and filled with details about what daily life was like for patrician Roman boys, providing painless history lessons along with the rousing story lines." The Guardian says readers "end up learning loads of interesting information about Ancient Rome as you go along - and even a bit of Latin!"

== Television adaptation ==
In 1958, Detectives in Togas was adapted by BBC Television in the United Kingdom as a six-episode children's serial under the title The Riddle of the Red Wolf. The adaptation was scripted by C. E. Webber.
