= Dietrich in London =

Live album by Marlene Dietrich
- Released: December 1965
- Recorded: December 12, 1964
- Genre: Traditional pop
- Length: 48:49 (U.S. CD version)
- Labels: Columbia Records; Pye Records (UK)
- Producer: Burt Bacharach

Marlene Dietrich chronology
Marlene singt Berlin, Berlin (1965)	Dietrich in London (1965)	The Legendary Marlene Dietrich (1967)

Dietrich in London is a live album by Marlene Dietrich documenting a concert performance at the Queen's Theatre in London during the 1960s. It features a selection of songs from her stage repertoire, including popular standards and contemporary folk pieces. The recording captures aspects of her theatrical presentation and stage presence, preserving key moments from the performance.

The album was released in multiple countries and editions, with minor variations in track listings and credits. Different versions acknowledged various production and musical direction roles, reflecting regional differences in the release. Photography and packaging details also varied between editions.

Critics noted Dietrich’s vocal interpretations, stage delivery, and the emotional and humorous elements of her performance. The album is regarded as a record of her later cabaret and theater career, providing insight into the evolution of her repertoire and performance style.

== Background ==
The concert that provided the material for Dietrich in London was recorded on 12 December 1964 at the Queen's Theatre, London, during Marlene Dietrich's engagement arranged by theatrical agent Binkie Beaumont. The engagement had begun on 23 November 1964 and marked her last major season with Burt Bacharach as accompanist, conductor, and arranger. The programme included twenty-two songs, of which fourteen were selected for the album release. The setlist featured only four numbers from Dietrich's films, reflecting a broader repertoire she had also performed at the Café de Paris, though the order of presentation had been altered. By this time, the cabaret act that had previously played in Piccadilly had evolved into a broader theatrical experience. The opening vaudeville acts and the quick-change into top hat and tails with chorus girls were removed, creating a more focused and solemn presentation that emphasized Dietrich's status as an international theater star.

A significant new dimension of her repertoire was the inclusion of folk anthems. Initially resistant, Dietrich was persuaded by her daughter Maria Riva and conductor Burt Bacharach to perform Pete Seeger's "Where Have All the Flowers Gone?" Discovering it translated powerfully into French and German, she first performed it in Paris and Germany before making it, along with Bob Dylan's "Blowin' in the Wind", a passionate part of her setlist. These songs, which became pop hits on the Continent, helped craft her latest persona as a kind of "Mother Courage." One of the most noted performances from this engagement was J. J. Niles's "Go 'Way from My Window", during which Dietrich broke down on stage. The moment was retained in the recording and appears on the album. According to David Bret, five tracks from Dietrich in London were later listed among Dietrich’s personal favourites.

Critical reception in Britain was notable, with Penelope Gilliat of The Observer and Harold Hobson of The Sunday Times both commenting on Dietrich's stage presence and delivery. Hobson noted a profound vulnerability in her performance, particularly praising her rendition of "Where Have All the Flowers Gone?" for its "mastered passion" and "controlled tempest of emotion". Kenneth Tynan, reviewing her a decade earlier, also returned and described her as delivering "the sacred goods", carrying the knowledge of war's tragedies in her voice and comparing her to a Brechtian character.

== Release details ==
On January 2, 1965, Chris Hutchins of Billboard magazine reported that Pye Records had captured Dietrich's final concert of her London season for release on an album the following month. The magazine reported on 25 December 1965 that the album's title would be Marlene in London. The LP was issue in the US in 1965 on Columbia Records label (catalog no. OS 2830). It was released in Australia by Philips Records in 1965 (catalog no. PD 191), coinciding with Dietrich's visit to the country in October of that year. The LP was released in Brazil in 1974 by Chantecler records to capitalize on Dietrich's anticipated tour, which ultimately was canceled.

The English and American editions of the album present minor variations in the way the track titles and timings are listed, although the content itself remains identical. The photography credits also differ: Carien Glass is credited on the English release, while Barry Glass appears on the American one. In addition, the English edition acknowledges Franklyn Boyd as producer and Burt Bacharach as musical director and conductor, credits that are not included on the American version.

During her live performance, Dietrich introduces the song "Jonny" by incorrectly explaining its narrative, claiming it is about a woman calling her lover. According to musicologist Michael J. Budds, she confuses the song with "Peter, Peter" from her repertoire, falsely identifies it as her first recording, and erroneously states it was never translated into English—despite having sung an English version in the film The Song of Songs (1933), which omitted the original German storyline about a woman addressing her unborn child.

In 1993, the label Jazz Door released the album on CD (catalog no. 1240) under the new title In Concert, with different cover art, as part of its The Ladies of the 20th Century series.

== Critical reception ==
Professional ratings
Review scores
Source	Rating
The Encyclopedia of Popular Music	3/5 stars

AllMusic described the album as an excellent document of Marlene Dietrich's later career as a cabaret star. The review noted that by the 1950s and 1960s Dietrich had already become a camp icon, enhancing her performances with self-deprecating humor that gave an added edge to signature songs such as "Johnny", "Lola", and the set-closing "Falling in Love Again". It also highlighted her interpretations of pop and jazz standards, including "I Can’t Give You Anything but Love" and "I Wish You Love", transformed by her world-weary voice. In addition, the critic praised her rendition of Édith Piaf's "La Vie en rose" as a touching tribute to one of her greatest influences, who had only recently passed away.

In a review published in the Brazilian newspaper Diário de Notícias, Roberto Moura wrote that the album "once again brings Dietrich's mystery", highlighting songs such as "Lola", "La Vie en Rose", "Falling in Love Again", and the "indefatigable" "Lili Marlene". Referring to comments in The Sunday Times and The Observer about the deep emotion provoked by the singer in London, Moura noted that "it is difficult to listen to Marlene Dietrich without repeating one of these commonplaces". He concluded that the mixing should have brought out Dietrich's voice more prominently, which would have made the result more effective.

== Commercial performance ==
According to David Bret the album sold "several" million copies worldwide.

== Track listing ==
No.	Title	Writer(s)	Length
1.	"I Can't Give You Anything But Love, Baby"	Dorothy Fields / Jimmy McHugh	2:35
2.	"The Laziest Gal in Town"	Cole Porter	2:35
3.	"Shir Hatan"	Zarav Shahar	3:04
4.	"La Vie en Rose"	Édith Piaf / Louiguy / Marguerite Monnot	3:10
5.	"Johnny"	Frederick Hollander	3:55
6.	"Go 'Way from My Window"	Hollaender / Phil Lynott / John Jacob Niles	3:10
7.	"Allein in Einer Großen Stadt"	Max Colpet / Franz Waxman	5:33
8.	"Lili Marlene"	Tommy Connor / Tommie Connors / Hans Leip / Norbert Schultze	3:40
9.	"Das Lied Ist Aus (Frag' Nicht Warum Ich Gehe)"	Robert Stolz / Walter Reisch	4:05
10.	"Lola"	Hollander	2:03
11.	"I Wish You Love"	Charles Trénet / Lee Wilson	3:25
12.	"Marie Marie"	Gilbert Bécaud / Pierre Delanoë	4:35
13.	"Honeysuckle Rose"	Andy Razaf / Fats Waller	3:27
14.	"Falling in Love Again"	Hollander / Sammy Lerner	3:22

== Personnel ==
Credits adapted from the LP Dietrich in London (Pye Records, catalog no. NPL 18113).

- Arranged By, Music Director – Burt Bacharach
- Producer – Franklyn Boyd

== See also ==
- Marlene Dietrich discography
