= Jean Gilbert =

German composer and conductor (1879–1942)

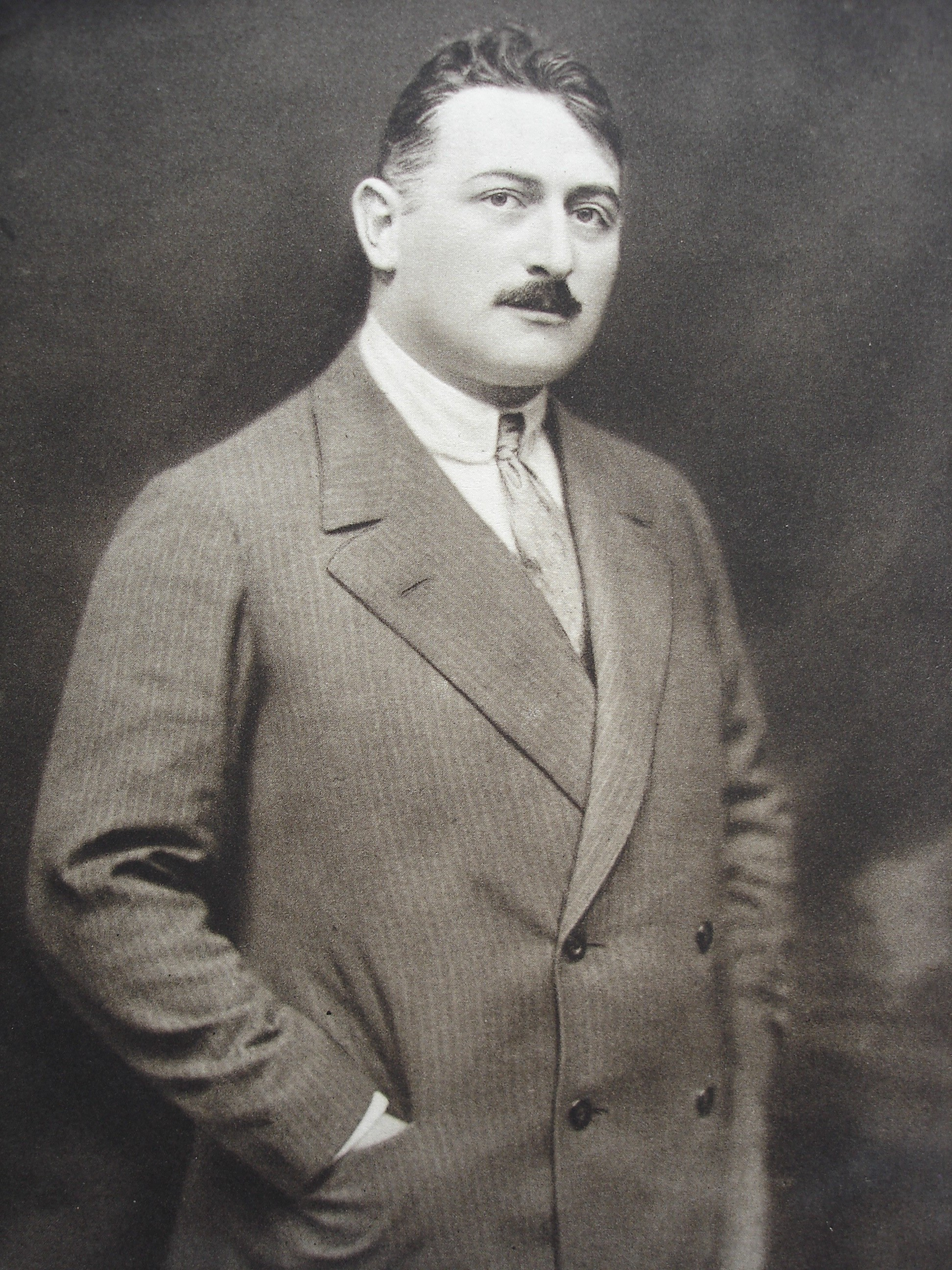
- Jean Gilbert, 1913
- Born: Max Winterfeld; 11 February 1879; Hamburg, Germany
- Died: 20 December 1942 (aged 63); Buenos Aires, Argentina
- Occupations: Composer, conductor
- Known for: Operettas
- Notable work: Die keusche Susanne (1910)
- Children: Robert Gilbert; Henry Winterfeld

Jean Gilbert (11 February 1879 – 20 December 1942), born Max Winterfeld, was a German operetta composer and conductor.

== Life and career ==
Gilbert was born in Hamburg into a family of musicians; his ancestors were cantors of the Jewish community, his cousin Paul Dessau became a famous composer and conductor. He attended composition lessons held by Philipp Scharwenka in Berlin and studied at the conservatories in Sondershausen and Weimar. After first public appearances as a pianist, the 18-year-old obtained an appointment as Kapellmeister in Bremerhaven. Soon after he moved to the Carl Schultze Theater in Hamburg and, at the age of 20, succeeded Leo Fall as musical director of the Centralhalle theatre on Hamburg's Reeperbahn.

He adopted the name of Jean Gilbert for the production of his first operetta Das Jungfernstift in 1901. He continued to work as a Kapellmeister at the Berlin Apollo-Theater on Friedrichstraße, where he conducted operettas by Paul Lincke. In 1908, Gilbert moved to Düsseldorf and again turned to composing. Back in Berlin by 1910, he composed more than 50 operettas before and after World War I. His most successful work was Die keusche Susanne (1910), which was also popular in an English adaptation as The Girl in the Taxi.

As a Jew, Gilbert was forced to leave Germany after the Nazi seizure of power in January 1933. He first emigrated to Madrid and later to Argentina, where he once again worked as a radio orchestra leader. He died in Buenos Aires. His elder son Robert Gilbert (1899–1978) was also a composer, his younger son Henry Winterfeld (1901–1990) became a well-known author of books for young readers.

== Selected works ==
- Das Jungfernstift, 1901, Hamburg
- Polnische Wirtschaft, 1909, Cottbus
- Die keusche Susanne, 1910, Magdeburg
- Autoliebchen, 1912, Berlin ("Ja, das haben die Mädchen so gerne")
- Puppchen, 1912, Berlin ("Puppchen, du bist mein Augenstern")
- Die Kino-Königin, 1913
- Fräulein Tralala, 1913 Konigsberg
- Die Frau im Hermelin, 1919, Berlin
- Katja, die Tänzerin, 1923, Vienna
- Das Weib in Purpur, 1923, Vienna
- Annemarie, 1925, Berlin
- Yvonne, 1926, London (with Vernon Duke)
- Hotel Stadt Lemberg, 1929, Hamburg

== Selected filmography ==
- One Hour of Happiness (1931)
- The Girl and the Boy (1931)
- Two Hearts Beat as One (1932)
