= Wiedersehen mit Marlene =

Live album by Marlene Dietrich
- Released: October 1960
- Genre: Traditional pop
- Length: 41:03
- Label: Electrola
- Producer: Burt Bacharach

Marlene Dietrich chronology
| Dietrich in Rio (1960) | Wiedersehen mit Marlene (1960) | Die neue Marlene (1965) |

Wiedersehen mit Marlene is a studio album by German-American singer and actress Marlene Dietrich. It was recorded in August 1960 following her controversial and emotionally charged concert tour in West Germany. The album was produced by her longtime musical director, Burt Bacharach.

Marketed as a live album, it features studio recordings from Cologne that were later overdubbed with audience applause from her tour performances. It was first released on the Electrola label in Germany and subsequently issued by Capitol Records in the United States, with a slightly altered track listing. A unique version without artificial applause was also released in East Germany.

The album consists primarily of German-language songs from Dietrich's early career, including several numbers immortalized in her 1930's film The Blue Angel. It was a commercial success in Germany and received attention from American trade publications upon its stateside release.

== Background ==
After leaving Germany due to the rise of Hitler and Nazism Dietrich's return to West Germany in 1960 for a concert tour which was met with mixed reception. Despite a consistently negative press, vociferous protest by chauvinistic Germans who felt she had betrayed her homeland, and two bomb threats, her performance attracted huge crowds. During her performances at Titania Palast theatre, protesters chanted, "Marlene Go Home!" On the other hand, Dietrich was warmly welcomed by other Germans, including Berlin Mayor Willy Brandt, who was, like Dietrich, an opponent of the Nazis who had lived in exile during their rule. The tour was an artistic triumph, but a financial failure. She was left emotionally drained by the hostility she encountered, and she left convinced never to visit again. East Germany, however, received her well.

== Production and recording ==
Produced in 1960, the album Wiedersehen mit Marlene was marketed as a live recording. However, it consists of studio recordings made in Germany that were subsequently overdubbed with applause captured during Dietrich's tour to simulate the atmosphere of a concert performance.

== Release ==
According to its August 29, 1960 issue, Billboard magazine reported that Marlene Dietrich had completed a night of recording sessions in Cologne to finish her LP for the Electrola label, a Capitol Records' German subsidiary. The magazine also revealed that the album would be titled Wiedersehen Mit Marlene Dietrich. The album was first released in Germany on the Electrola label (catalogue number 1C 062-28 473 MD). Its successful launch was noted in the November 7, 1960, issue of Billboard, which reported that the album had entered the market two weeks earlier. An alternative version, devoid of the artificial applause, was released in East Germany on the Amiga label under the title Hallo Marlene (Amiga 840030), which features a selection of ten tracks from the original album. The recording was later reissued in CD format by DRG Records on February 6, 2006.

On May 20, 1961, the music industry trade magazine Cash Box featured the album in its release listings, noting it as one of the prominent new titles to have been released that May in the United States. The American pressing on Capitol Records (Capitol T10282) omits the track "Kinder, heut' abend, da such ich mir was aus". A stateside reissue was formally announced in the April 15, 1967 issue of Billboard, where it appeared in the publication's 'New Album Releases' section. The album remained a key part of Dietrich's catalog for years. During her 1968 Broadway comeback show, copies of Wiedersehen mit Marlene were sold in the theater lobby alongside her other albums.

== Critical reception ==
Professional ratings
Review scores
| Source | Rating |
|---|---|
| The Encyclopedia of Popular Music | 4/5 stars |

Cash Box described the album as "a testament to the universal appeal of a matchless artist". The reviewer noted that "the great Dietrich sings in German" and highlighted the inclusion of two songs from her iconic film The Blue Angel—"Falling in Love Again" ("Ich bin von Kopf bis Fuß auf Liebe eingestellt") and "I'm Naughty Little Lola" ("Ich bin die fesche Lola")—as well as her famous rendition of "Lili Marleen".

Stanley Green of HiFi/Stereo Reviewe, noted that the repertoire of songs from the 1920s was "so perfect for the singer." While he observed that Dietrich had "sounded better on discs" than on this live recording, he highlighted her performance of the unfamiliar song "Marie, Marie" as a particular standout, delivered with "a gripping intensity of feeling that is little short of startling". Green concluded by stating that the material suited her so well that he "would be content if she were never again to sing anything in English".

LIFE noted the historical significance of the album, recorded during Dietrich's celebrated return to Berlin. The critic described the collection as "pleasing" and sung in her "haunting, husky-voiced manner", which was called her "imperishable trademark". The review concluded that the album was "recommended mainly for the sentimental roué set", positioning it as a work for a sophisticated and nostalgic audience.

== Commercial performance ==
According to Billboard, just two weeks after its release, the album was already reported as a best-seller in Germany.

== Track listing ==
| No. | Title | Writer(s) | Length |
|---|---|---|---|
| 1. | "Ich bin von Kopf bis Fuß auf Liebe eingestellt" | Friedrich Hollaender | 3:15 |
| 2. | "Ich Bin Die Fesche Lola" | Hollaender / Richard Rillo | 2:29 |
| 3. | "Wer wird denn weinen" | Hugo Hirsch / Arthur Rebner | 1:34 |
| 4. | "Mein Blondes Baby" | Fritz Rotter / Peter Kreuder | 4:08 |
| 5. | "Peter" | Hollaender / Peter Kreuder | 3:45 |
| 6. | "Allein in Einer Grossen Stadt" | Franz Wachsmann / Max Colpet / Kurt Gerhardt | 3:29 |
| 7. | "Wenn Ich Mir 'Was Wunschen Dürfte" | Hollander | 3:33 |
| 8. | "Johnny, wenn du Geburtstag hast" | Hollander | 3:13 |
| 9. | "Marie - Marie" | Gilbert Becaud / Pierre Delanoe | 4:54 |
| 10. | "Lili Marlene" | Norbert Schultze / Hans Leip | 3:02 |
| 11. | "Ich weiß nicht, zu wem ich gehöre" | Hollaender / Robert Liebmann | 2:43 |
| 12. | "Ich hab' noch einen Koffer in Berlin" | Ralph Maria Siegel / Aldo von Pinelli | 3:05 |
| 13. | "Ein richtiger Mann (Kinder, heut abend)" | Hollaender | 2:10 |

== Personnel ==
Credits adapted from the LP Wiedersehen Mit Marlene by Electrola (catalog no. E 83 220, WCLP 685).

- Orchestra – The Orchestra of Burt Bacharach
- Conductor – Burt Bacharach
- Vocals – Marlene Dietrich

Credits adapted from the LP Hallo Marlene by AMIGA (catalog no. 8 40 030).

- Graphics [Grafiker] – Ehbets
- Leader [Großes Orchester] – Burt Bacharach
- Liner Notes – Hannelore Neumann
- Performer – Marlene Dietrich, Großes Orchester*

Credits adapted from DRG Records' Wiedersehen Mit Marlene CD (catalog no. DRG Records – 91513, EMI Music Special Markets – 509992-65297-2-1)

- Executive Producer Hugh Fordin
- Produced for reissue by Cy Godfrey
- Photographs courtesy of Photofest
- Production Associate: Anaida Garcia
- Art Direction and Design: Elizabeth Yoori
