= Die Travellers =

Die Travellers, originally Die 3 Travellers, were a German musical group known for their novelty, comedy and schlager records.

The group formed in Berlin in 1946. The members were Fred Oldörp (bandoneon, vocals, 1920–1984), Eduard Roth (guitar, vocals, 1922–1990), and Mischa Andreyev (bass, vocals, 1922–1968), later replaced by Klaus Komoll (1928–1982) and from 1982 to 1984 Wolfgang Müller. They recorded many popular songs in Germany, between the early 1950s and the late 1970s, when they disbanded. Oldörp also recorded under the name Frank Olsen.
