= Robert Gilbert (musician) =

German composer and writer (1899–1978)

- Born: Robert David Winterfeld; 29 September 1899; Hamburg, Germany
- Died: 20 March 1978 (aged 78); Minusio, Switzerland
- Occupations: Composer, lyricist, singer

Robert Gilbert (born Robert David Winterfeld) (29 September 1899 – 20 March 1978) was a German composer of light music, lyricist, singer, and actor. His father was Max Winterfeld, a composer and conductor who went by the pen name of Jean Gilbert. His brother was Henry Winterfeld, an author of children's books. Sometimes described as a "divided author", his early depression-era poem "Stempellied" about living on the dole was set to music by Hanns Eisler. But "Am Sonntag will mein Süsser mit mir segeln gehen" ("On Sunday I'll go sailing with my Sweetheart") and "Das gibt's nur einmal" ("It Happens Only Once"), became his better known work.

== Life ==
Gilbert was born in Berlin, and was a soldier during the last year of World War I, where he came in contact with socialist and communist ideas that the political awareness of the 1900s had aroused. After his service in the war, he studied philosophy and art history in Berlin and in Freiburg and was engaged in political campaigns and demonstrations during this time.

Gilbert's father, Jean Gilbert, born Max Winterfeld, was the son of a Hamburg businessman. Winterfeld struggled to enter the world of the theatre, beginning as a conductor and composing various pieces. French vaudeville was in fashion and in 1901, when Robert was one year old, he adopted the pen-name of Jean Gilbert. The family was poor for years and lived in seedy hotels, his father had to work nights playing piano wherever he could find work. Sometimes it was so cold that Robert's mother, Rosa, had to keep warm in bed while sewing hats to earn a little extra money.

For a time, Robert's father was the conductor of a 40-man orchestra in a circus, an adventurous playground with circus elephants for Robert and his younger brother Henry. But this life did not last much longer. Jean Gilbert's operettas, Polnische Wirtschaft (1909) and Die keusche Susanne (1910) were hugely successful and his song, "Pupchen, du bist mein Augenstern" became a hit. By 1911, Jean Gilbert was world-famous and rich. He had houses, women, an unusual family and wealth. But Robert rebelled.

In 1918, Gilbert was drafted into the army, and there he came in contact with revolutionary ideas from a group of friends who belonged to a group known as the Spartakists. He attended worker's meetings, listened to their speeches, and was moved by their hardships. Then, after his release from the army, he studied philosophy in Berlin and Freiburg and read Goethe and the major German writers. He met new friends who gave him work by Marx and Engels and became determined to try to improve conditions for working people. He went to demonstrations and took part in political actions. Many years afterwards, in an interview, he said, "I thought I could change the world. Later, my friends and I realized: we didn't change the world; the world changed us."

In 1928, under the pen-name of David Weber, he wrote for Ernst Busch, the popular proletarian singer, das "Stempellied": "Keenen Sechser in der Tasche/ Bloß 'nen Stempelschein./ Durch die Löcher der Kledasche/ Kiekt de Sonne rein." ("Not a penny in my pocket/ Just a voucher for the dole".) Hanns Eisler, who often visited Gilbert along with others from the circle of communist sympathizers, wrote the music for the depression era song. Then in 1929, came the cheerful "Am Sonntag will mein Süsser mit mir segeln gehen" ("On Sunday I'll go Sailing with my Sweetheart"). Gilbert himself recognized the split in his writings, stating that, "a certain conflict persisted throughout my whole life. I had a gift for entertainment and light music that largely came from my father. Along with that, I also always wrote other things." Those "other things" were the many songs that brought him a substantial income. A colleague, Horst Budjuhn expressed this split with his belief that Gilbert was always inspired by poetry and money.

In the 1920s, during the period of inflation there was a row of depressing and cynical songs in which life was worthless. But when the economy recovered he returned to light music and between 1929 and 1931 came many of Gilbert's romantic hits that became his best-remembered works. "How I created hits, I've never known. I was always surprised when people suddenly began singing 'Das gibt's nur einmal' or 'Liebling, mein Herz lässt dich grüssen'.", Gilbert stated.

In 1930 for the operetta Das Weisse Rössl (The White Horse Inn), Gilbert worked on the libretto and also included his own song, "Was kann der Sigismund dafür, dass er so schön ist?" ("Is it Sigismund's fault that he's so handsome?") The show became a huge success with many hit songs. From there UFA contracted with Gilbert to make films, beginning with Die Drei von der Tankstelle, which inaugurated his long musical collaboration with Werner Richard Heymann with such hits as "Ein Freund, ein guter Freund", ("A Friend, a Good Friend"), and "Liebling, mein Herz läst dich grüssen" ("Darling, my heart sends you greetings"). The partnership continued with Der Kongress tanzt, and the hit "Das muss ein Stück vom Himmel sein" ("This must be a piece of Heaven") and the song that always remained associated with both of them, "Das gibt's nur einmal, das kommt nicht wieder" ("This happens only once, it doesn't come again"). The next hit movie was Bombs on Monte Carlo, which featured the hits "Eine Nacht in Monte Carlo" and "Das ist die Liebe der Matrosen" ("The love life of sailors").

But the opportunity for further success was denied when Adolf Hitler became chancellor in 1933 and the first of the Nuremberg laws were enacted which denied Jews access to work in theater, film, music or any arts or entertainment occupations or venues. And Gilbert along with his family fled Berlin. The next years were spent in Vienna, where Gilbert learned the Viennese dialect and continued writing poetry as the Nazi influence gained strength until Austria welcomed Hitler in 1938. Since Jews were not allowed to travel, it was only with great difficulties that he escaped from Austria to France and from there to America in 1939.

For ten years, Gilbert, his wife Elke and their daughter Marianne lived in Riverdale, a suburb of New York City for ten years. There Gilbert set himself the task of learning English, especially the everyday language as spoken in the streets, with hopes of eventually reaching Broadway. In the meantime, he found work in clubs and cabarets, which brought an intermittent income, while Elke worked in factories as a seamstress. During these years, Gilbert published his first volume of poetry, Meine Reime, Deine Reime, which contained his serious insights, along with sharp political satire, and reminiscences of the lost beloved city of Berlin. The volume was admired by Bertolt Brecht who hoped to get it re-published in Germany.

Meanwhile, Robert's father Jean Gilbert and his second family were also forced to flee from Nazi Germany, travelling first to Spain, then to England and finally Argentina. Jean Gilbert found work as an orchestra conductor for Buenos Aires Radio in 1939, certainly a comedown from his earlier wealth and renown in Germany, but still a good position where he could use his musical talents. He died there unexpectedly in 1942 at the relatively young age of sixty-three.

Despite improving his American English, Gilbert's efforts to reach the Broadway theatres were unsuccessful and in 1949, he returned to Europe. There the post-war theatre and film industry was reviving, not in Berlin, which was still a divided city, but in Munich. Gilbert was welcomed upon his return and in 1950 he had a successful one-man theatrical evening. After the end of the wartime ban on works by Jewish writers and composers, his earlier songs were played everywhere. These continued to provide some income. One striking feature of Gilbert's interviews and appearances during this time was that there was no mention of the reason for his ten-year absence or of the Nazi murderous persecution of Jews.

But it had been twenty years since Gilbert's early successes and it wasn't just the landscape that had changed, after the war musical tastes changed also. Though he worked tirelessly, his later songs could not attain the popularity of his earlier "evergreens". During these years, as he had in America, he worked on the serious side of his lifelong writings, creating a long near-epic poem about his wanderings entitled The Organ-Grinder's Odyssey, which some critics, like Hannah Arendt, considered his best work. Toward the poem's end, the narrator describes the Berlin he had returned to in 1949: bombed-out buildings still covered with ashes and dust, bleak in winter's cold, the actual city not unlike the one he had envisioned in New York City in 1940. Gilbert's Odyssey ends with an account of the returning dynamism of Germany's Economic Miracle with its author painfully aware that the rising computer generation was leaving him and his peers behind.

In the 1950s he entered a second marriage and, after the birth of the couple's son, Stefan, Gilbert moved with his new family to Locarno in Switzerland's Tessin region. Then in the 1960s, he embarked on a successful second career translating American Broadway musicals. A former close boyhood friend, Frederick (Fritz) Loewe introduced Gilbert to his collaborator, Alan Jay Lerner, and that meeting resulted in a string of major hits – the German translations of Annie Get Your Gun, Hello Dolly, Gigi, My Fair Lady and Man of La Mancha. All of these international hit shows are still played in revivals in many theatres throughout German-speaking countries.

Gilbert died in Locarno, Switzerland, in 1978 at the age of seventy-eight. A record of his work with titles of the nearly 400 songs he wrote as well as the five volumes of his poetry, and many personal letters can be found at the Akademie der Künste in Berlin.

== Selected filmography ==
- Light-Hearted Isabel (1927)
- Kohlhiesel's Daughters (1930)
- The Battle of Bademunde (1931)
- Amourous Adventure (1932)
- The White Horse Inn (1952)
- The Forester's Daughter (1952)
- The Sky Is Blue (1964, TV film)
