= Puff, the Magic Dragon =

1963 song by Peter, Paul and Mary

Single by Peter, Paul and Mary

from the album Moving
- B-side: "Pretty Mary"
- Released: January 1963
- Recorded: 1962
- Genre: Pop; folk; children's music
- Length: 3:27
- Label: Warner Bros.
- Songwriters: Leonard Lipton; Peter Yarrow
- Producer: Albert Grossman

Peter, Paul and Mary singles chronology
"If I Had a Hammer" (1962)	"Puff, the Magic Dragon" (1963)	"500 Miles" (1963)

"Puff, the Magic Dragon" (or just "Puff") is an American folk song written by Peter Yarrow of Peter, Paul and Mary from a poem by Leonard Lipton. It was made popular by Peter, Paul and Mary in a 1962 recording released in January 1963.

Lipton wrote a poem about a dragon in 1959, and, when Yarrow found it, he wrote the lyrics to "Puff" based on the poem. After the song was released, Yarrow searched for Lipton to give him credit for the song.

== Lyrics ==
The lyrics for "Puff, the Magic Dragon" are based on a 1959 poem by Leonard Lipton, then a 19-year-old Cornell University student. Lipton drew inspiration from Ogden Nash's 1936 poem "The Tale of Custard the Dragon". The song tells the story of an immortal dragon named Puff and his playmate, Jackie Paper, as they embark on adventures in the fictional land of Honalee. As time passes, Jackie matures and abandons his childhood games, leaving Puff sad and alone.

Lipton, who was acquainted with Peter Yarrow through a mutual friend at Cornell, used Yarrow's typewriter to commit his poem to paper. He forgot about it until years later, when a friend informed him that Yarrow was seeking him out to properly credit him for the lyrics. Upon reconnecting, Yarrow shared half of the songwriting credit with Lipton, who received royalties for the song until his death in 2022. Yarrow died in 2025.

In later performances, Yarrow changed the line "A dragon lives forever, but not so little boys" to the more inclusive "A dragon lives forever, but not so girls and boys". The original poem included a stanza about Puff finding a new playmate, but this was not incorporated into the song.

== Reception ==
Cash Box described it as "a charming folk tune, about a magic dragon, right-up-the-vocal-alley of the remarkably successful folksters."

== Speculation about drug references ==
After the song's initial success, speculation arose—as early as a 1964 article in Newsweek—that the song contained veiled references to smoking marijuana. The word "paper" in the name of Puff's human friend Jackie Paper was said to be a reference to rolling papers, the words "by the sea" were interpreted as "by the C" (as in cannabis), the word "mist" stood for "smoke", the land of "Honahlee" stood for hashish, and "dragon" was interpreted as "draggin'" (i.e., inhaling smoke). Similarly, the name "Puff" was alleged to be a reference to taking a "puff" on a joint. The supposition was claimed to be common knowledge in a letter by a member of the public to The New York Times in 1984.

The authors of the song repeatedly rejected this interpretation and have strongly and consistently denied that they intended any references to drug use. Both Lipton and Yarrow had stated, "'Puff, the Magic Dragon' is not about drugs." Yarrow frequently explained that the song is about the hardships of growing older and has no relationship to drug-taking. He also said that the song has "never had any meaning other than the obvious one" and is about the "loss of innocence in children." He dismissed the suggestion of it being associated with drugs as "sloppy research".

In 1973, Peter Yarrow's bandmate, Paul Stookey of Peter, Paul and Mary, also defended the song's innocence in a novel way. He recorded a version of the song at the Sydney Opera House in March 1973 where he set up a fictitious trial scene. The prosecutor of the trial claimed the song was about marijuana, but Puff and Jackie protested. The judge finally left the case to the "jury" (the Opera House audience) and said if they would sing along, the song would be acquitted. The audience joined in with Stookey and at the end of their sing-along, the judge declared the "case dismissed".

Up to his death in January 2025, Yarrow maintained that the song did not reference marijuana.

== Notable recordings and chart performance ==
In 1961, Peter Yarrow joined Paul Stookey and Mary Travers to form Peter, Paul and Mary. The group incorporated the song into their live performances before recording it in 1962. The trio's 1962 recording of "Puff the Magic Dragon" entered the top 40 of the Billboard Hot 100 charts on March 30, 1963, and peaked at number two, kept out of the top spot by "I Will Follow Him" by Little Peggy March. It topped Billboard's Adult Contemporary charts. It also reached number ten on Billboard's R&B chart. In Canada, the song reached number five in April 1963. Covers by The Seekers and Nina and Frederick have also received considerable airplay.

=== Weekly charts ===
Chart (1963)	Peak position
Australia	6
Canada (CHUM Chart)	5
New Zealand (Lever Hit Parade)	3
U.S. Billboard Hot 100	2
U.S. Billboard Middle-Road Singles	1
U.S. Billboard R&B	10
U.S. Cash Box Top 100	2

=== Year-end charts ===
Chart (1963)	Rank
U.S. Billboard Hot 100	16
U.S. Easy Listening	19
U.S. Cash Box	24

== Notable cover versions ==
During the autumn of 1966, Swedish pop band Fabulous Four, which included Lalla Hansson, recorded the song; the session was produced by keyboardist Benny Andersson, later of ABBA fame. Released as a single in November of that year, it was the group's first release on independent record label Hep House, started by Andersson's band Hep Stars, following Fabulous Four's departure from Fontana Records. The single, backed by a cover of Woody Guthrie's "This Land Is Your Land", became a hit. It debuted at number one on Tio i Topp on November 26, 1966, staying there for three consecutive weeks before being replaced by Donovan's "Mellow Yellow". On sales chart Kvällstoppen, the single reached number three on December 20, 1966.

== Adaptations ==
A 1978 animated television special, Puff the Magic Dragon, adapted the song. It was followed by two sequels, Puff the Magic Dragon in the Land of the Living Lies and Puff and the Incredible Mr. Nobody. In all three films, Burgess Meredith voiced Puff. In September 1979, a picture-book based on the animated feature, written by Romeo Muller, known for his contributions to the Rankin-Bass holiday TV specials, was published by Avon Books. In December 2016, it was announced that Fox Animation would produce a live-action/animation film based on the song with Mike Mitchell as director. As of November 2020, the progress of this project had no updates, leading some fans to conclude that it has been quietly canceled.

The song was adapted for a children's pantomime, which played at Sydney's Seymour Centre in 1983.

A 2007 book adaptation of the song's lyrics by Yarrow, Lipton, and illustrator Eric Puybaret gives the story a happier ending with a young girl (presumed by reviewers to be Jackie Paper's daughter) seeking out Puff to become her new companion. The lyrics remain unchanged from the Peter, Paul, and Mary version; the young girl is only seen in the pictures by illustrator Puybaret. On the last page of the book, she is introduced to Puff by an older Jackie Paper.

The tune was used by Versatec, a computer printer company, in the promotional LP Push the Magic Button for the song of the same name.

American fabulist Robert Coover wrote about the later lives of Puff and Jackie Paper in "Sir John Paper Returns to Honah-Lee", the first story in his collection A Child Again (McSweeney's Books, 2005).

== Parodies ==
In the mid 1970s, an American Jewish band named Ruach created a parody version of the song entitled "Puff the Kosher Dragon". In the course of the song, Kosher Puff eats kosher food, has a bar mitzvah, fights anti-Semites, and finally marries and brings up his children as loyal members of the faith. The Ruach song has been noted as one of the first examples of a modern Jewish band using a popular secular tune.

Both tune and elements of the lyrics were adapted in the controversial parody "Barack the Magic Negro", written and recorded by Paul Shanklin for Rush Limbaugh's radio program, after the term was first applied to then presidential candidate Barack Obama by movie and culture critic David Ehrenstein. In a Los Angeles Times op-ed column of March 19, 2007, Yarrow condemned the act as "shocking and saddening in the extreme," stating that "taking a children's song and twisting it in such vulgar, mean-spirited way, is a slur to our entire country and our common agreement to move beyond racism ... It is almost unimaginable to me that Chip Saltzman, who sent the CD [as a Christmas greeting to RNC members], would seriously be considered for the top post of the Republican National Committee. Puff, himself, if asked, would certainly agree."

== Vietnam War gunship ==
During the Vietnam War, the AC-47 Spooky gunship was nicknamed the "Dragon" or "Dragon ship" by the Americans because of its armament and firepower. The nickname soon caught on, and American troops began to call the AC-47 "Puff the Magic Dragon". Robert Mason in his memoir Chickenhawk writes, in reference to the Peter, Paul, and Mary song playing on a turntable: "'Puff the Magic Dragon' was making me uncomfortable. It was the saccharine song that had inspired the naming of the murderous Gatling-gun-armed C-47s. I couldn't listen."

== In popular culture ==
- The song is a favorite of Jack Byrnes in the 2000 comedy film Meet the Parents. Greg Focker makes light of the urban legend of the song being about drugs, which an irritated Jack has never heard. In the film's sequel, Meet the Fockers, Jack has rigged his RV's horn to honk out the first notes of "Puff, the Magic Dragon".
- Elon Musk, founder of SpaceX, said his Dragon spacecraft was named after "Puff, the Magic Dragon".

== See also ==
- List of Billboard Middle-Road Singles number ones of 1963
- "Lucy in the Sky with Diamonds", another song denied by its author to be about the use of drugs ("LSD")
- "Crystal Blue Persuasion", also not about drugs according to its author
