= Lenny Lipton =

American author (1940–2022)

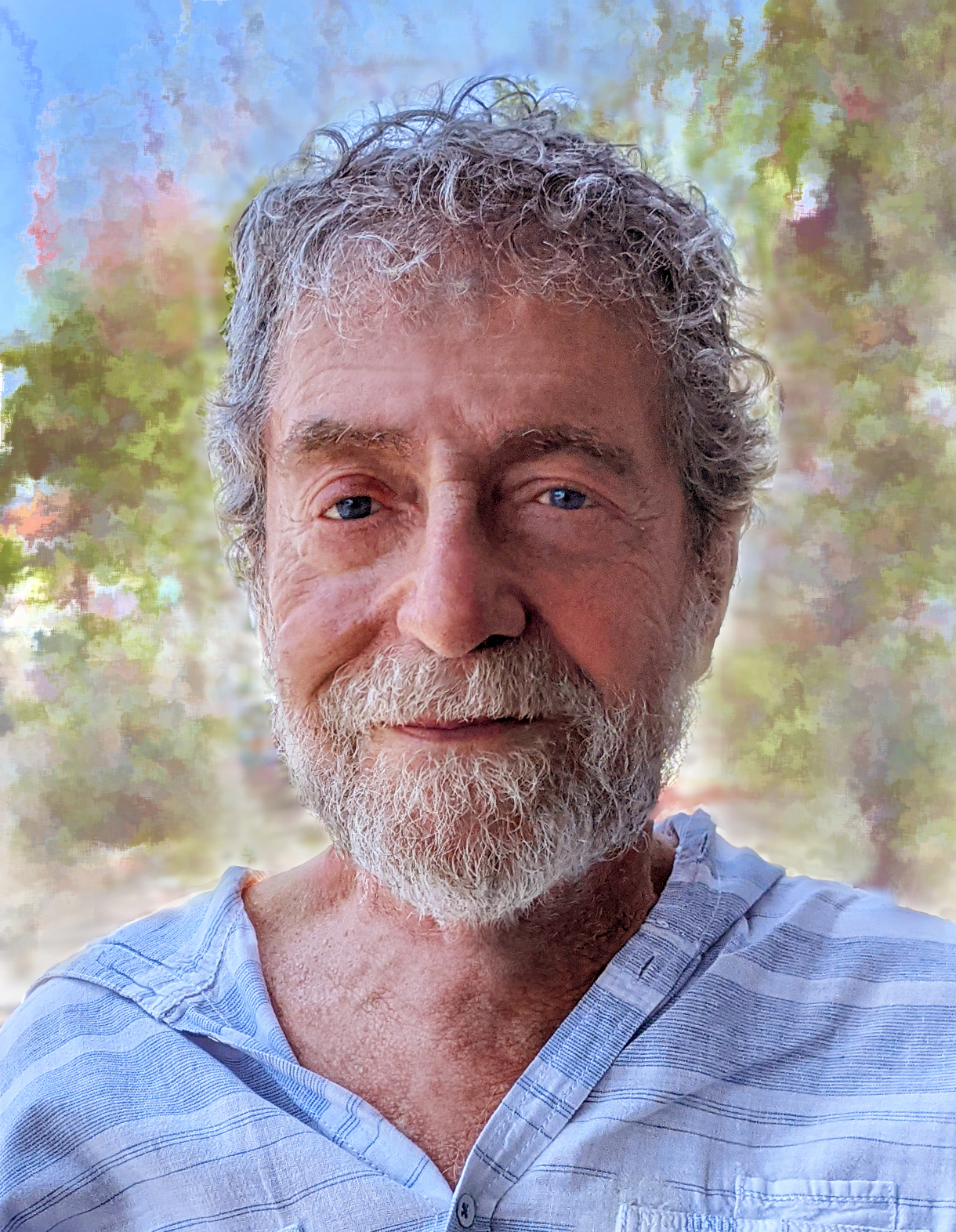
- Lipton in 2021
- Born: Leonard Lipton; May 18, 1940; Brooklyn, New York, U.S.
- Died: October 5, 2022 (aged 82); Los Angeles, California, U.S.
- Occupations: Inventor; author; experimental filmmaker; lyricist
- Years active: 1959–2022
- Known for: "Puff, the Magic Dragon", 3D display technology, history of motion picture technology

Leonard Lipton (May 18, 1940 – October 5, 2022) was an American author, filmmaker, lyricist, and inventor. At age 19, Lipton wrote the poem that became the basis for the lyrics to the song "Puff, the Magic Dragon". He wrote books on independent filmmaking and was a pioneer in the field of projected three-dimensional imagery. Lipton developed 3D technology that is used in RealD 3D theaters and is used to show 3D films on more than 30,000 theater screens worldwide.

In 2021, he published The Cinema in Flux, an 800-page illustrated book on the history of cinema technology.

== Early life ==
Lipton was born in Brooklyn, New York. He majored in physics at Cornell University after starting out in electrical engineering. A self-described "mediocre student", he only excelled once he found a field he loved. Lipton urged schools to be more "accepting of eccentric people with a different point of view because we are the people who make the difference."

== Career ==
=== Puff, the Magic Dragon ===
Lipton was 19 when he wrote the poem that was adapted into the lyrics for the 1963 song "Puff, the Magic Dragon", performed by Peter, Paul and Mary. His inspiration was a 1936 Ogden Nash poem, "The Tale of Custard the Dragon". "Pirates and dragons, back then, were common interests in stories for boys", Lipton said. "The Puff story is really just a lot like Peter Pan." Lipton spent decades denying that the song was about marijuana and believed that the myth was created by New York columnist Dorothy Kilgallen.

=== Independent films ===
In the 1960s, Lipton shot several experimental films on 16 mm stock, most with running times of less than 10 minutes. The best known, Let a Thousand Parks Bloom, a 27-minute film about Berkeley's People's Park, played at the Tate Liverpool Museum and the Whitney Museum of American Art. The following decade, he wrote two books on technologies and methods for independent filmmakers: Independent Film Making (1972) and The Super 8 Book (1975). Lipton on Filmmaking, a compendium of his magazine writings, was published in 1979.

=== Stereography ===
Lipton was a pioneer in the field of projected three-dimensional imagery and was one of the creators of the electronic stereoscopic display industry. His interest dated back to his childhood in New York where he attended movie palaces, with some films shown in 3D. He drew his own 3D comics using red and green crayons on tracing paper, which were viewed using primitive glasses constructed of cardboard tubes and magnifying lenses.

Royalties from "Puff the Magic Dragon" and Independent Filmmaking, which remained in print for 20 years, gave Lipton an independent income that allowed him to follow his interests. His career in stereoscopic display began to gel around 1972. In one early stint, he served as the "convergence setter" for the 1983 3D film Dogs of Hell, determining for each shot the optimal position at which to cross the dual lens axes. Previewing a scene from the film, technical staff from Universal were impressed by the stereoscopic imagery.

He built a prototype of a flicker-free, field-sequential 3D display system and founded StereoGraphics Corporation in 1980 to fund development. The system worked by doubling the display rate of images, thereby overcoming a problem inherent in 3D motion picture projection, where each eye views only half the available images. In 1989, he patented the active ZScreen polarization filter that uses a circularly polarized liquid crystal filter placed in front of a projector, which can then display both the left and right halves of a stereo pair. After Real D Cinema acquired StereoGraphics in 2005, the technology became the basis for the RealD cinema system. The system is in use in more than 30,000 screens worldwide. Lipton was the chief technology officer at RealD until 2009, when he left to do independent consulting.

Lipton published his definitive treatment of the subject, Foundations of the Stereoscopic Cinema: A Study in Depth, in 1982. In 2011, the International 3D Society gave him its Century Award for Lifetime Achievement. As of 2015, he held 68 stereography-related patents.

=== History of motion picture technology ===
In 2021, Lipton published The Cinema in Flux: The Evolution of Motion Picture Technology from the Magic Lantern to the Digital Era. In the 800-page illustrated book, Lipton argues that film scholars mistakenly consider inventions that preceded the 19th century motion picture cameras from Thomas Edison and the Lumière brothers as prehistory. Lipton sets the genesis of the medium to 1659 and Dutch physicist Christiaan Huygens' invention of the magic lantern, marking the first time moving images were projected on a screen. The book divides the history into three eras: glass, celluloid, and digital. Flux's origins date back to 2009, when Lipton was speaking at the Cinémathèque Française, whose museum happened to be exhibiting a history of magic lantern technology. His subsequent research led him to the Academy of Motion Pictures Arts and Sciences' Margaret Herrick Library, the Society of Motion Picture and Television Engineers digital library, The Library of Congress's collection of motion picture periodicals, and some 400 books.

Film historian Laurent Mannoni, the curator of collections at the Cinémathèque Française, wrote that the book represents "the first time that this vast technical and aesthetic history has been told by an inventor-technician-physicist-industrialist, who has himself filed patents for cinematographic inventions, run a company and made films. His point of view is both authoritative and fascinating since, until now, no conventional historian has had such varied credentials...."

In his foreword, Douglas Trumbull wrote that Lipton "is on the trail of a vitally important nexus between the illusion of motion and the story contained within that illusion." Each new innovation raises the question of whether theater will become "an even more high-powered juggernaut of immersive and experiential technical perfection"—a theme park ride with no heart—or remain an emotional experience relying on the traditional talents of screenwriters, directors, and actors. "Lenny Lipton delivers the background we need to help make sure that our beloved art form does not go off the rails."

== Personal life and death ==
Lipton was married to Julie and had four children. He died from brain cancer in Los Angeles, on October 5, 2022, at age 82.

== Books ==
- Independent Filmmaking (1972)
- The Super 8 Book (1975)
- Lipton on Filmmaking (1979)
- Foundations of the Stereoscopic Cinema: A Study in Depth (1982)
- The CrystalEyes Handbook (1991)
- Puff, the Magic Dragon: Peter Yarrow, Lenny Lipton, Eric Puybaret (2007)
- The Cinema in Flux: The Evolution of Motion Picture Technology from the Magic Lantern to the Digital Era (2021)
