= Max Colpet =

American screenwriter (1905–1998)

Max Colpet (also known as Max Kolpe, real name Max Kolpenitzky, 19 July 1905 – 2 January 1998) was an American writer, scriptwriter and lyricist of Russian-German descent.

== Life ==
He was born to a Russian Jewish family in Königsberg, then in East Prussia. Due to the political situation at the time, he was stateless when born. In 1914 at the start of the war his family fled to the West. In 1928, with Erik Ode, he founded the cabaret Anti in Berlin. In the 1930s he fled again, this time to Paris. His parents died during World War II in concentration camps.

On 14 August 1953 he became an American citizen, but in 1958 he moved to Munich where he lived for the rest of his life. Among other writings, he wrote for the Münchner Lach- und Schießgesellschaft, a cabaret theatre founded by Sammy Drechsel and Dieter Hildebrandt. He had a lifelong friendship with Billy Wilder for whom he wrote five screenplays. In Los Angeles, Colpet lived in the guest house behind Wilder's Beverly Hills house, 704 North Beverly Drive, until Wilder sold the house to Dr. Harry Lehrer and fashion designer Anne T. Hill in 1957 and moved to Century City.

== Selection of German lyrics ==
- "Allein in einer großen Stadt" (Music: Franz Wachsmann; Singers: Lale Andersen, Marlene Dietrich)
- "Bitte geh nicht fort" – "Ne me quitte pas", (Music: Jacques Brel; Singer: Marlene Dietrich)
- "Der Boss ist nicht hier" (Music: Lotar Olias; Singer: Freddy Quinn)
- "Hoppla, jetzt komm ich" (Music: Werner Richard Heymann; Singer: Hans Albers)
- "Kleine treue Nachtigall" – "Message to Martha/Michael" (Music: Burt Bacharach; Singer: Marlene Dietrich)
- "Sag mir, wo die Blumen sind" – "Where Have All the Flowers Gone?" (Music: Pete Seeger; Singer: Marlene Dietrich)
- "Der ewige Soldat" – Donovan: "Universal Soldier"; (Music and Original lyrics: Buffy Sainte-Marie; Singer: Dominique, Juliane Werding)
- Charley’s Tante (Musical, based on Charley's Aunt by Brandon Thomas; Music: Ralph Maria Siegel)
- West Side Story (German lyrics of the musical by Leonard Bernstein [Music] and Stephen Sondheim [lyrics])

== Selected filmography ==
- All Is at Stake (dir. Max Nosseck, German-language film, 1932)
- Scampolo (dir. Hans Steinhoff, German-language film, 1932)
- The Blue of Heaven (dir. Victor Janson, German-language film, 1932)
- Madame Wants No Children (dir. Hans Steinhoff, German-language film, 1933)
- Mauvaise Graine (dir. Billy Wilder and Alexander Esway, French-language film, 1934)
- The Crisis is Over (dir. Robert Siodmak, French-language film, 1934)
- Behind the Facade (dir. Georges Lacombe and Yves Mirande, French-language film, 1939)
- Beating Heart (dir. Henri Decoin, French-language film, 1940)
- Premier rendez-vous (dir. Henri Decoin, French-language film, 1941) – (uncredited, as a Jewish writer in Nazi-occupied France)
- Heartbeat (dir. Sam Wood, English-language film, 1946) – Remake of Beating Heart (1940)
- Germany, Year Zero (dir. Roberto Rossellini, 1948)
- Once a Thief (dir. W. Lee Wilder, English-language film, 1950)
- Love Without Illusions (dir. Erich Engel, German-language film, 1955)
- Her First Date (dir. Axel von Ambesser, German-language film, 1955) – Remake of Premier rendez-vous (1941)
- The Man Who Couldn't Say No (dir. Kurt Früh, German-language film, 1958)
