= James Yeoburn =

English entrepreneur and producer

- Born: James Yeoburn; 30 December 1989 (age 36); Exeter, UK
- Education: Leeds Conservatoire, Exeter College, London School of Musical Theatre
- Alma mater: Leeds Conservatoire
- Occupation: Producer
- Years active: 2011–present
- Spouse: Amy Beadel (2004–present)

James Yeoburn (born 30 December 1989) is an English producer and entrepreneur. He is the founder of international theatre production company United Theatrical.

== Early life and education ==
Yeoburn was born in Exeter, Devon and grew up on the Harefield Estate outside the village of Lympstone. James is one of two sons of retired competition swimming coach and sales director Michael Yeo, and Patricia Yeo (née Akin), a property manager and daughter of RAF flight lieutenant the late John Akin. James has one brother and three half- brothers.

From an early age, James worked under the mentorship of Maurice Marshal MBE at the Northcott Theatre, working in the technical department for visiting and in house productions

Yeoburn is a graduate of Exeter College, Leeds Conservatoire and the London School of Musical Theatre.

== Producer ==
In 2012 Yeoburn along with long-term friend, composer and producer Stuart Matthew Price, founded United Theatrical.

The pair had worked a year earlier on a concert to celebrate the contribution to the industry made by Dress Circle (Theatre Shop), a theatrical shop in London's Covent Garden selling original cast albums, musical scores and memorabilia. The shop which had been supporting the industry for 33 years before its closure was facing financial difficulty. A series of events were planned throughout July and August 2011 some that took place at the shop and others around London. The series concluded with a West End concert of peers, featuring a cast of 50 and an orchestra of 32, that took place at Her Majesty's Theatre on 14 August 2011. Yeoburn and Price assembled an international cast including: Jonathan Ansell, Rosemary Ashe, Julie Atherton, Samantha Barks, Tracie Bennett, Graham Bickley, Simon Bowman, Daniel Boys, Rebecca Caine, Bertie Carvel, Kim Criswell, Alex Gaumond, Ellen Greene, Ramin Karimloo, Robyn North, Lara Pulver, Peter Polycarpou, Joanna Riding, Frances Ruffelle and Hannah Waddingham.

The concert reunited the members of the original London casts of the musicals Miss Saigon, Witches of Eastwick, Parade (musical) and Avenue Q.

In 2013 theatre critic Mark Shenton announced that James would be behind the London debut concerts for Broadway composer and lyricist Andrew Lippa, at the newly built St James Theatre, London. In the same season appeared off-Broadway composing duo Kait Kerrigan and Bree Lowdermilk who gave concerts of their work with performances from a cast including Rachel Tucker. In 2014 Kait Kerrigan and Bree Lowdermilk returned to the St James Theatre, London under Yeoburn and Price's stewardship with further concerts headlined by Michael Arden called One (More) Night in London.

Yeoburn and producing partner Price developed and produced a new production by American composer Scott Evan Davis in 2014 entitled Picture Perfect, starring Lucie Jones. Jones later pulled out of the production owing to scheduling conflicts, and was replaced by Charlotte Wakefield.

In 2015 Yeoburn produced One of Those, by British playwright Tom Ward-Thomas which opened at the Tristan Bates Theatre in London's Covent Garden to critical acclaim. The play which featured a cast of five including Martin Ball, Louise Bangay and Ward-Thomas himself ran for four weeks. The production is set to tour the UK.

Ward-Thomas is the brother of British country music duo Ward Thomas (band).

=== Collaboration with Michael Feinstein ===
It was announced on 30 March 2016 that a new adaptation, entitled The Gold Room would be developed by Yeoburn based on the life of Woolworth heiress Barbara Hutton. The musical is written by multi-platinum and Grammy Award nominated recording artist Michael Feinstein and Warner Brown, writer of Walking with Dinosaurs. The London development workshop features a cast including British actor Jamie Muscato and Broadway actress Melissa Errico. Covent Garden Productions are reported to share the option.

=== The Addams Family ===
On 5 September 2016 it was announced that Yeoburn would act as above title producer on the UK premier of the Broadway musical The Addams Family Musical. The production opened in Edinburgh, Scotland on 20 April 2016. Speculation about the production preceded its official announcement with reports from Whatsonstage that Yeoburn and co-producers Price and Katy Lipson were bringing the Broadway Musical to London in a premiere at London's St James Theatre, as early as 2014. Yeoburn and producing producers appointed Matthew White to direct the production as early as 2014, after Yeoburn and he worked together in 2013 at Riverside Studios in Hammersmith, London, England.

=== Rosa Parks ===
Yeoburn is the producer on a new title about the life of American civil-rights activist Rosa Parks. The musical, which is being developed with a cast including Cornell S John and Cat Simmons, is being prepared for a full-scale production having received interest from both sides of the Atlantic. In a press statement released on 8 August 2016 he commented:

"[The writers] have captured in their work the rise of one of history's most powerful women whose life was spent campaigning for equality not only for her race but for her gender and class. We are delighted to see how beautifully this translates for the stage. This is a human story about an everyday person investing fearlessly in what she felt was right and her contribution has never been more relevant. Rosa's story is taught to all ages throughout the education systems both in the US and here in the UK. Her message remains strong and continues to empower our leaders of tomorrow.”

=== A Spoonful of Sherman ===
On 20 December 2017, the launch of the A Spoonful of Sherman UK/Ireland tour premiered at the EM Forester Theatre in Tonbridge, Kent on 14 February 2018. The tour played in 25 cities across the UK and Ireland and was produced by Yeoburn through his company United Theatrical alongside previous Spoonful producers Kat Portman Smith and Robert J. Sherman of MusicWorld (UK) Ltd. Cast members for the tour included Sophie-Louise Dann, Mark Read, Glen Facey, Jenna Innes and Ben Stock.

=== London Musical Theatre Orchestra ===
On 28 June 2016, Yeoburn and United Theatrical launched the London Musical Theatre Orchestra; a professional orchestra dedicated the advancement of musical theatre for the benefit of the public with Yeoburn acting as the Organisations first Executive Director London Musical Theatre Orchestra is the world's first professional orchestra dedicated to Musical Theatre.

In June 2016 Richard Rodgers and Oscar Hammerstein's State Fair and Alan Menken's A Christmas Carol were announced as the organisations first concerts.

Three time Olivier Award winner Robert Lindsay and Carrie Hope Fletcher were announced to headline LMTO's production of A Christmas Carol on 25 November 2016.

In February 2017 it was announced that the organisation would present Jason Robert Brown's Broadway musical Honeymoon In Vegas, as a UK premiere, at the London Palladium. The production would star Maxwell Caulfield, Samantha Barks, Arthur Darvill, Rosemary Ashe, Nicolas Colicos and Simon Lipkin. Ashe and Barks previously worked with the producer pair in 2011 on an award-winning celebratory concert for Dress Circle.

== On stage ==
After graduating from Leeds College of Music in 2009, James appeared in touring opera productions around the UK, before working in London, the UK and internationally. Shortly after gaining a masters from London School of Musical Theatre he appeared in a new production of Aladdin with Creation Theatre Company and later was later cast in Payback a new musical which opened at The Riverside Studios, Hammersmith with Sarah Earnshaw and Matthew White.

James played the role of "Mordecai" in Bumblescratch, a musical written by Robert J. Sherman. The story is set during the Plague and Great Fire of London.

Yeoburn worked alongside director Thom Southerland on a new production of Daisy Pulls it Off, in which he played Mr Scoblowski. The production which had a cast including Suanne Braun, Holly Dale Spencer and Adam Venus, received high critical acclaim from the theatre press.

In June 2014 Yeoburn appeared in the role of Ben in Rags (musical) at the Lyric Theatre Shaftesbury Avenue alongside Sebastian Croft, Caroline Sheen and Maureen Lipman.

== Entrepreneur ==
Yeoburn holds an active interest in the wider international business community and has contributed to a number of start-ups in technology, media, childcare and consumer internet. In 2013 he co-founded Bea & Co, a creative childcare company headquartered in London, acting as its chief operations officer. The company which counts American Express, HBO, AccorHotels, onefinestay and Working Title Films amongst its clients, employs over 100 staff and operates in three territories worldwide.

== Personal life ==
James lives in Blackheath, southeast London with his wife, casting director Amy Beadel and their son Casper (born January 2021). They previously lived in Chelsea. The pair met as teenagers in 2004 during a production at Northcott Theatre Exeter, in which they both appeared.

James is the first cousin of former Somerset cricketer Adam Dibble, and England cricketer Jodie Dibble.
