= Save Your Sorrow =

1925 song

"Save Your Sorrow (For Tomorrow)"

Song by George Olsen and His Music
- B-side: "The Kiss I Can't Forget"
- Published: 1925
- Released: 1925
- Genre: Traditional pop
- Label: Victor
- Composer: Al Sherman
- Lyricist: B.G. DeSylva

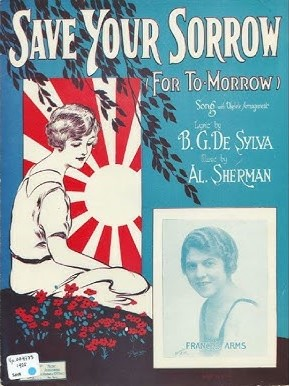
Sheet music cover, 1925

"Save Your Sorrow (For Tomorrow)" is a popular song first published in 1925 written by Tin Pan Alley tunesmiths, Al Sherman and B.G.DeSylva. The publisher was Shapiro, Bernstein & Company, based in New York City. Songwriter, Al Sherman's son, Robert (a future Academy Award winning songwriter) was just born and Al did not have the money to pay the hospital bill. Upon arriving home from the hospital, Al discovered the first royalty check from "Save Your Sorrow" in his mailbox and was therefore able to pay the bill.

== Excerpt from Walt's Time ==
The following is an excerpt from the book Walt's Time which is a joint autobiography by brothers, Robert and Richard Sherman (sons of songwriter Al Sherman):

In 1925, Dad got a $500 advance for "Save Your Sorrow." Having five hundred dollars was like a miracle to him- Just the day before, he had borrowed a dollar from his mother-in-law so that he and Mom could eat. Dad went to the bank and cashed the advance into ten dollar bills, fifty of them. He took them home and spread them all out on the bed. When Mom got home he told her she looked a little tired, and suggested she take a nap. At the sight of all that much needed money, and with son Robert due in a couple of months, Mom burst into happy tears. In fact they both did. But when Bob was born, the advance didn't stretch far enough to pay all the hospital bills. Mom and Dad's worries turned to happy tears once again when another miracle occurred– Dad's first royalty check for "Save Your Sorrow" arrived just in time to let them bring Bob home.

This story is recounted in the 2014 cabaret show, A Spoonful of Sherman by Al Sherman's grandson, Robert J. Sherman. It was also recorded on the SimG Records original cast recording released in 2015.

== Recorded by ==
Early popular versions in 1925 were by Shannon Four and Ray Miller, with Gene Austin's version following in 1926.

Other versions were recorded by:

- Dave Caplan (1925)
- Eddie Condon
- Bing Crosby - recorded August 9, 1945 with Eddie Heywood and His Orchestra.
- Lars Edegran and His New Orleans All Stars
- Harry Frankel
- The Fontane Sisters
- Glen Gray Orchestra
- Eddie Heywood
- Jeff Healey
- Betty Johnson
- Frankie Laine
- Donald Lambert
- Peggy Lee - recorded October 7, 1949.
- Gisele MacKenzie
- Louis Mazetier
- Ray Miller
- Emilie Mover
- Red Nichols
- George Olsen
- Leon Redbone
- Harry Simeone & Hugo Montenegro
- Morris Stoloff
- Tiny Tim
- Bob Wilber

amongst others.

== Media appearances ==
"Save your Sorrow" was used as the opening theme to the popular radio sitcom Fibber McGee and Molly from 1935 to 1940.

In the 1956 film He Laughed Last, Frankie Laine performs the song.

== Literary sources ==
- Sherman, Robert B. Walt's Time: from before to beyond. Chapter 2; "Al's Time", Pages 88-141. Santa Clarita: Camphor Tree Publishers, 1998.
