= Great Fire of London in popular culture =

The Great Fire of London has been discussed, referenced, or recreated in popular culture numerous times.

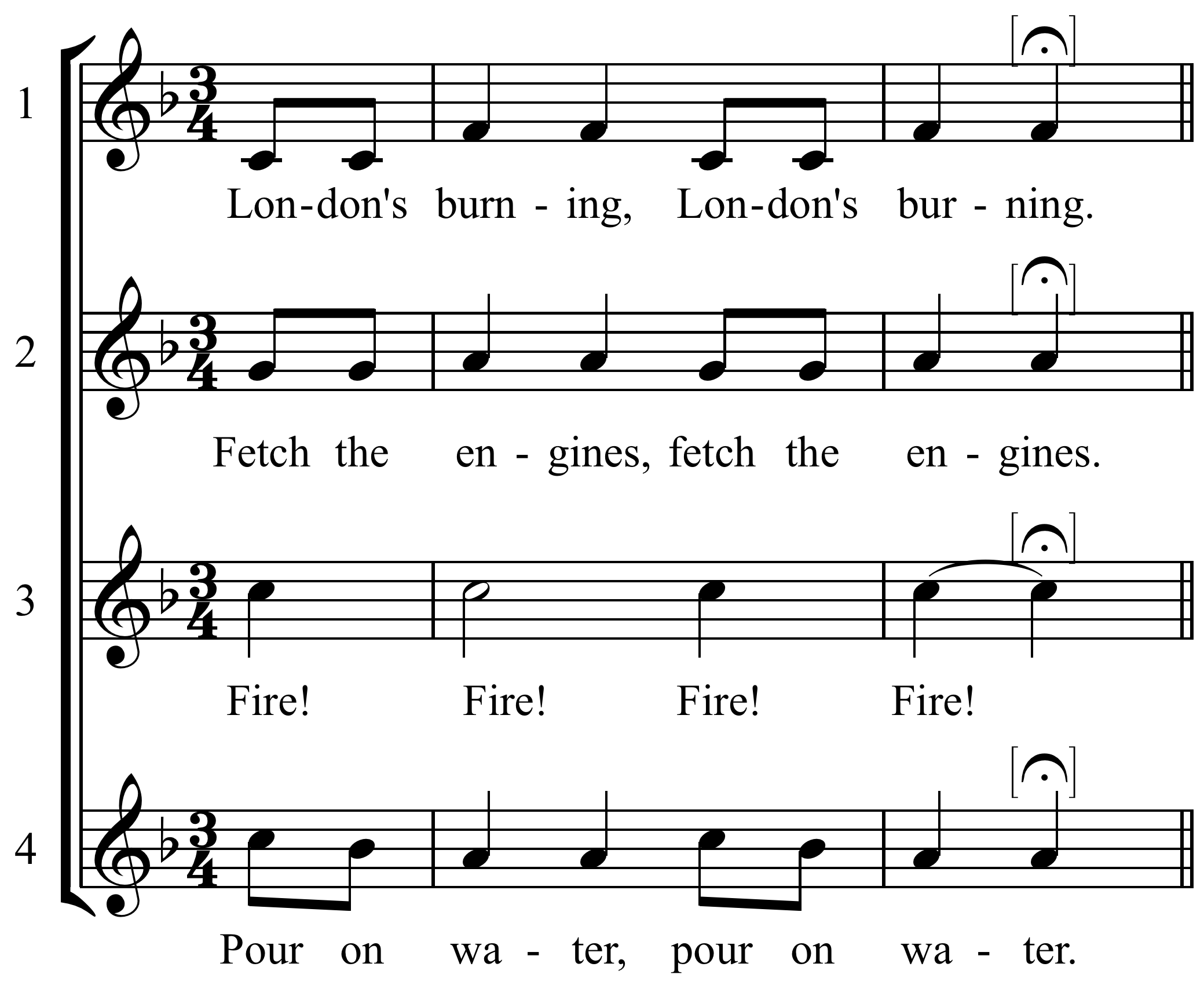
"London's Burning"

== Literature ==
The diaries kept by Samuel Pepys during the period became very popular in the following decades.

William Harrison Ainsworth's novel Old St Paul's is set during the events of the fire.

"Timequake", a feature in the 1978 science fiction comic Starlord, suggested that the fire was inadvertently started by inept time-travelling agents.

== Television ==
The Great Fire was released on ITV television in 2014. It was shown in four episodes. It constructs a fictional scenario involving the Pudding Lane baker's family in the alleged Popish Plot.

The catchphrase of fictional firefighter Fireman Sam is "Great fires of London!" which is a reference to the Great Fire of London.

The 1982 Doctor Who serial "The Visitation" takes place during the final days of the Great Plague of 1665 and ends with the Fifth Doctor starting the Great Fire to destroy a Terileptil base hidden in Pudding Lane. The Fourth Doctor also mentions being present for the fire and accused of starting it in "Pyramids of Mars".

The Grisly Great Fire of London is a special episode in the Horrible Histories TV series, released in 2016 to mark the 350th anniversary of the fire.

== Music ==
The round "London's Burning" is said to be about the Great Fire. However, the first notation of a song on this theme dates from 1580 as "Scotland's Burning".

The musical, Bumblescratch by Robert J. Sherman is set during the Great Plague of 1665 and the Great Fire of London in 1666. The musical premiered as part of the 350th Anniversary commemoration of the Great Fire on September 4, 2016 at the Adelphi Theatre. The show starred actor Darren Day as the story's titular character, plague rat "Melbourne Bumblescratch". A cast album of the score was also released by SimG Records later that year.

== Film ==
In the 2005 film Batman Begins, Ra's al Ghul, the leader of the League of Shadows, states that the League "Sacked Rome, loaded trade ships with plague rats, burned London to the ground".
