= Moose: Chapters from My Life =

Autobiography by Robert B. Sherman

- 1st ed. cover
- Editor: Robert J. Sherman
- Author: Robert B. Sherman
- Cover artist: Robert J. Sherman (photograph and design)
- Language: English
- Subject: Autobiography
- Publisher: AuthorHouse
- Publication date: November 26, 2013 (hardback)
- Publication place: United States
- Pages: 458
- ISBN: 978-1-491-88366-2
- OCLC: 865495543
- Preceded by: Walt's Time

Moose: Chapters From My Life is the 459-page autobiography by the Academy Award-winning songwriter Robert B. Sherman. "Moose is a collection of fifty-four autobiographical short stories, arranged in such a way as to express a larger narrative." The book was edited by Sherman's younger son, Robert J. Sherman, who also provided the general layout, cover art and graphic design for the book. Other than certain pages in the "My Time" photographic sections of Moose, (which were completed after the author's death on March 6, 2012) the majority of the book, including its innovative arrangement of chapters, was created during the author's lifetime and under his personal supervision. Moose was published by AuthorHouse Publishers of Bloomington, Indiana, in association with AuthorSolutions, Penguin Random House Company affiliates. First publication of the work occurred posthumously, on November 26, 2013. The majority of short stories which comprise the book, were written between 1993–2004 with one or two stories having been known to exist as early as 1945. Although early "mock-up" versions of the book were circulated among Sherman's close friends and members of his family in 2004, according to the editor's introductory chapter, "About Moose", mass publication had to be delayed "for reasons too cumbersome to delve into here." Both the book and its author were credited in the 2013 Walt Disney film release, Saving Mr. Banks which starred Academy Award–winning actors Emma Thompson and Tom Hanks. Actor B. J. Novak portrayed a young Robert Sherman in the film. Several scenes from the film drew direct inspiration from Moose. This was done with the author's consent.

== Background ==
Moose is a collection of short stories taken from the author's life. Chapters were deliberately organized out of sequence. The purpose of this untraditional structure was to introduce the reader to the author's life story thematically rather than as a recounting of chronological events. Publishers were initially unimpressed with the author's stylistic approach, but the author felt strongly that the use of this technique was essential to the overall success of the narrative. This disagreement was, in part, what delayed publication by nearly a decade.

== Contents ==
Moose: Chapters From My Life 2016 Audible Audiobook Cover, Orchard Hill Press

=== Handwritten inscription ===
On the front page of the book is a facsimile of a handwritten letter (excerpt) written by Sherman to his parents (in 1944) as an 18-year-old US Army soldier, immediately prior to his deployment to Europe to fight in World War II. The letter was found by Sherman's son among his papers, in an envelope labeled, "To Be Opened Upon the Event of My Death". The excerpt reads: "If God placed my mission in this world as writing - I would have written for the benefit of my fellow man, and for his pleasure and observance of himself and his actions, (his injustices.) I would have spent my life devoted to showing man to himself in all his truth."

=== Text ===
Most of the book is written in prose text. Moose is divided into seven major sections which are subdivided into an aggregate 54, true, anecdotal short stories. (The author was lauded for his candor.) Chapters cover a range of intriguing and/or transformative moments in the author's life. Subjects range from his service in the United States Army during World War II when he led the first squadron of eight men into Dachau Concentration Camp during its liberation, to his years working as a staff songwriter for Walt Disney at Disney Studios. Through the text, the author introduces the reader to scores of colorful real life characters (some famous, some who are otherwise unknown). Moose concludes with the author reflecting on the life he has led. The author makes these reflections, largely from his reading room in the Mayfair district of London, England, by then, his adopted home. (Sherman moved from Los Angeles to London shortly after his wife, Joyce's death in 2001; immediately after the 2002 premiere of Chitty Chitty Bang Bang at the London Palladium.

=== My Time (sections 1-4) ===
Interspersed between the major literary sections of Moose is a comprehensive, four-part series of photographic chapters entitled, "My Time". The "My Time" sub-chapters are an annotated, visual overview of Robert Sherman's life and relationships (both personal and professional). The four sub-chapters provide a linear context to what might otherwise read as a disparate collection of short stories. The photographic sub-chapters are a succinct yet comprehensive account of Sherman's relationship with his brother and songwriting partner, Richard M. Sherman (the other half of the Academy Award-winning Sherman Brothers songwriting team). How affable the brothers' relationship actually was, has been a subject of debate since the 2009 release of Walt Disney Pictures's The Boys: The Sherman Brothers' Story and the 2013 release of Walt Disney Pictures's Saving Mr. Banks. The making of both films is touched upon in the "My Time" sections. "My Time" also covers many of the other significant relationships that the writer had during his life including his marriage to his wife Joyce (of 48 years), his relationship with his parents, employers, collaborators, friends and children.

The title "My Time" is an allusion to the author's previous joint-autobiographical effort, Walt's Time: From Before To Beyond which was published in 1998. The three main sections of Walt's Time are "Walt's Time" (covering the Sherman Brothers' years of service to Walt Disney), "Al's Time" (a reference to the Sherman Brothers' father, Tin Pan Alley songwriter Al Sherman) and "Our Time" which refers to the twenty-five years that followed the death of the Sherman Brothers' two respective mentors (Walt Disney's death in 1966 and Al Sherman's death in 1973) and the publication of the book (Walt's Time) in 1998.

In Moose: Chapters From My Life, the header, "My Time" refers to Robert Sherman's life post-"Walt's Time", post "Al's Time" and post-"Our Time". Although the four sections cover Sherman's entire life, the meaning of the "My Time" sub-chapters is revealed through the fourth and final section, and only readily apparent provided the reader is already familiar with the aforementioned sections of Walt's Time. The fourth sub-chapter illustrates Sherman's zeal for life despite the many losses he suffered. Also implied is the author's desire to live his life on his own terms, a theme consistent throughout the book as a whole. "My Time" (part 4) covers Sherman's life experiences during the fourteen years between the publication of Walt's Time and the completion of Moose (1998-2012).

== Critical acclaim ==
- Charles Shubow of BroadwayWorld.com wrote: "It's a fascinating book about a fascinating man. It follows his life growing up and his time during World War II. But the parts about Disney and the making of Mary Poppins are worth the read...I highly recommend the book."
- George Taylor of The Disney Review wrote: "I will say, right off the bat, that it's an incredibly enjoyable read."
- Jeff Heimbuch of Mice Chat wrote: "We know Robert as one half of the prolific song writing team, but this book proves that he was also a fantastic writer as well."
- Tim Calloway of The Mouse Castle wrote: "The book is a wonderful telling of episodes in Robert Sherman's life from his harrowing service during World War II (a battle wound would force him to walk with a cane for the rest of his life) to his award-winning success at Disney writing songs with his brother Richard."
- Phil Mounsey of Publishing Today wrote: "AuthorHouse UK is proud to be the publisher of this fine memoir, Moose, by one of the few in the world, who was an insider to the magic and reality of Disney and Hollywood in their pomp and who can truly say he was there; Robert B. Sherman."
- Dizradio.com wrote: "Robert B. Sherman brings his true story to light in his autobiography, Moose: Chapters From My Life. Sherman holds nothing back in the candid book, from the horrors he saw as a frontline liberator in World War II to his successful career alongside Walt Disney in the 1960s and beyond.

== Saving Mr. Banks meets Moose ==
In 2010, mutual acquaintances of Moose editor, Robert J. Sherman, and Saving Mr. Banks producer Alison Owen (Ruby Films) arranged a meeting in London. (Owen's associate, Josh Davis, represented Owen at the meeting.) Excerpts from an early version of the Kelly Marcel/Sue Smith screenplay were given to Sherman to bring to his father, Robert B. Sherman, for his review. (The scenes given to Sherman were ones which specifically featured the Sherman Brothers as characters. After reviewing the script sides, Robert B. Sherman agreed to provide an advance copy of the chapter in Moose which specifically dealt with the lead up to and making of Walt Disney's film Mary Poppins. The chapter was entitled, "'Tween Pavement and Stars". In exchange for their help, Owen agreed to list the book and author in the final credits of the film. This was the only compensation the Robert Shermans received. In the summer of 2012, a few months after Robert B. Sherman died, Robert J. Sherman (serving at that point in the capacity of "Trustee" of the Robert B. Sherman Estate) met again with the Saving Mr. Banks creatives including producer Alison Owen, director John Hancock and writer Kelly Marcel. A few days prior to the meeting, Sherman had been given a revised version of the full script. (Principal photography was to commence in two weeks' time.) Elements of the Moose excerpt had been incorporated into the new script. One important contribution is apparent in the scene in between Tom Hanks (as "Walt Disney") and Emma Thompson (as "Pamela Travers") during which Disney derides Travers for insisting that there is "No Red In London". Although the characters speaking the dialogue are different than those portrayed in the book, the dialogue is nearly identical. About the "No Red In London" sequence, scriptwriter Kelly Marcel later blogged, "Anything that shocked me and surprised me went in, because that's how you make drama, you know? I think the one that freaked me out the most, that I could not believe, was that she wouldn't allow the color red to be in the film."

== British Book Launch – A Spoonful of Sherman ==
On January 6, 2014, Moose editor, Robert J. Sherman produced, wrote and emceed a two night cabaret at the St. James Theatre in London entitled A Spoonful of Sherman. The event marked the official launch of his father's (posthumously released) autobiography: Moose: Chapters From My Life. After performances, Sherman participated in a book signing. The show was billed as "A Celebration of the Life, Times and Songs of Robert B. Sherman" and was extremely well received by the crowd and the critics alike. The cast consisted of four rising West End theatre stars including Charlotte Wakefield, Emma Williams, Stuart Matthew Price and Greg Castiglioni. Musical Direction was by Colin Billing and the show was directed by Stewart Nicholls. The show was produced by MusicWorld (UK). Joanne Benjamin and Clive Chenery of The Entertainment Business were general managers, James Albrecht of St. James Theatre Productions running front of house.

A Spoonful of Sherman received outstanding notices, garnering four stars from Clive Davis of the London Times as well as four and five star reviews from dozens of other papers and online reviewers. The show covered ninety years of Sherman songwriting (including material written by the Sherman Brothers' father, Al Sherman (who first started writing music in the early 1920s.) Songs written by the younger Robert Sherman were also included in the show as well) but the focus of the evening was the music and lyrics of Robert B. Sherman and the Sherman Brothers. "In deciding which songs to select, particular emphasis was put on material that would propel the narrative of Robert B. Sherman's life forward for the audience. My narration would then fill in the gaps. Of course almost all of the famous stuff makes it in. Mary Poppins, Chitty Chitty Bang Bang, Winnie the Pooh, The Jungle Book and "It's A Small World (After All)" are all represented, but I'm particularly pleased that we were able to include some unexpected gems in the mix as well." A Spoonful of Sherman was so successful in its own right, that the show was brought back a second time in 2014. In 2015 an original cast recording was released both digitally and on CD by SimG Records. In 2017 a pared down version of the show returned to London and it was announced in December 2017 that the show will be embarking on its first UK/Ireland tour in 2018.

== Publishing details ==
A First Edition of Moose: Chapters From My Life was published by AuthorHouse (a Penguin Random House Company) in November 2013 (paperback, ISBN 978-1-4918-8366-2). In December 2013 it was published (hardcover, ISBN 1-4918-8381-2). It is also available electronically on Amazon Kindle. In October 2016 the unabridged audiobook version of the book was released by Orchard Hill Press (Audible Audiobooks, ASIN B01M10102G) with Robert J. Sherman reading the text, the total running time clocked at 11 hours, 43 minutes.
