= Stuart Matthew Price =

British actor and singer

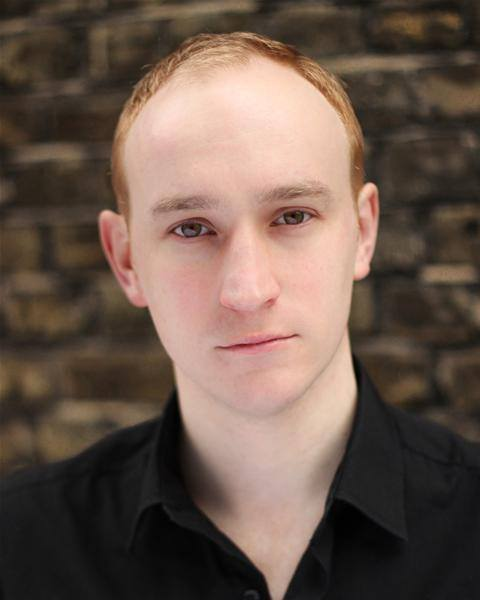
Portrait of Matthew Price

Matthew Price (born 6 August 1983 in Kidderminster, England) is a British actor, dancer and West End stage and concert singer known for playing Riff Raff in three European tours of The Rocky Horror Show. He is also a composer, having written Before After (2014) and Imaginary (2017) among other musicals and a theatrical producer, being a co-founder with James Yeoburn of the international production company United Theatrical.

== Early life ==
Price is the second son of Shelley Price and William Price and sibling to older brother Daniel Price. Originating from the West Midlands, Price actually grew up in Bedhampton, near Portsmouth. He attended Bishop Luffa School in Chichester until 1999 when he moved to London to pursue his performing career at The BRIT School for Performing Arts and Technology.

Price knew he wanted to be an actor from the early age of 9 when he took to the stage for his first role as The Pirate King in his school's production of Gilbert and Sullivan's The Pirates of Penzance. From then, Price joined the local amateur dramatic society where he performed in multiple shows aged from 11 to 15. His professional career began early once he joined the National Youth Music Theatre in 1997. With NYMT, Price performed in Tin Pan Ali (Assembly Rooms, Edinburgh Festival Fringe) and the critically acclaimed production of Bugsy Malone (Edinburgh Festival Theatre, Lyric Theatre in Hammersmith, 1997) which then went on to have a short West End run at the Queen's Theatre on Shaftesbury Avenue (1997) featuring well-known performers Sheridan Smith, Jamie Bell and Michael Jibson.

== Personal life ==
In 2020, Price married vocalist Heather Lundstedt. In June 2021 they welcomed their first child into the world; a baby boy named Archie William Lundstedt Price.

== Career ==
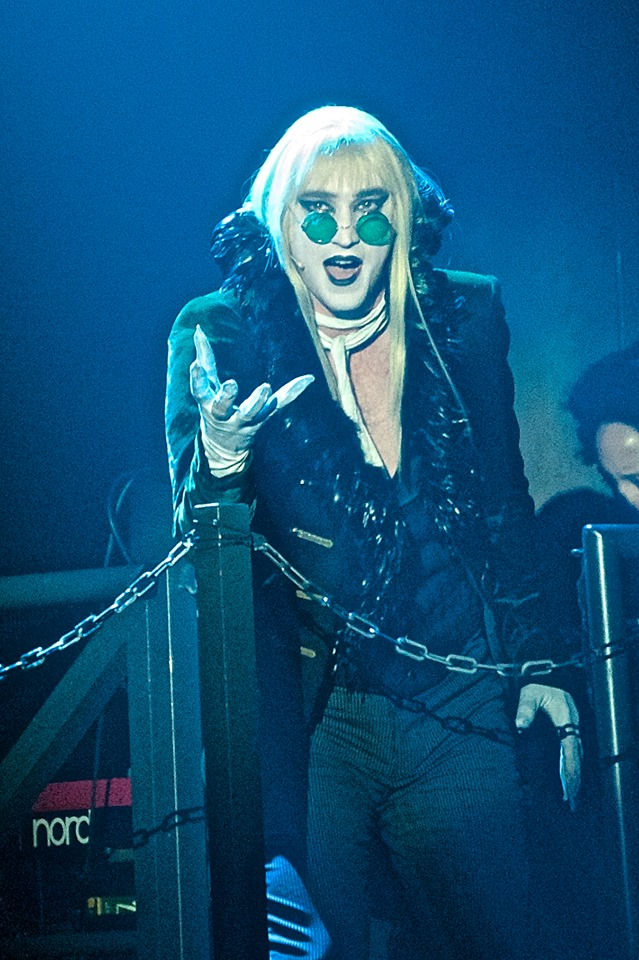
Stuart Matthew Price as Riff Raff in the European tour of The Rocky Horror Show (2017-18)

Price attended Mountview Academy of Theatre Arts (2004–07) where he was offered a full scholarship and graduated with a first class honours degree in Performance before making his London stage début creating the role of the Young Soldier and Frankie Epps in the critically acclaimed production of Parade at the Donmar Warehouse (2007). Other stage roles include Riff Raff in the European tours of The Rocky Horror Show (2008-9, 2014–15, 2017–18); Tony Gross in The A–Z of Mrs P (Southwark Playhouse, 2014); Julian in Dear World (Charing Cross Theatre, 2013); Dallas in Sweet Smell of Success (Arcola Theatre); Frank Capra in Mack and Mabel (Southwark Playhouse, 2012); Andrew van Helsing in Vampirette (Manchester Opera House); Stix in Shrek The Musical (Theatre Royal, Drury Lane, 2011), Scotty in Merrily We Roll Along (Sondheim 80th Birthday Celebrations – Donmar Warehouse, 2010); Yasha/Steve in The Cradle Will Rock (Arcola Theatre, 2010); Jordan in Departure Lounge (Edinburgh Festival); Jesus in Jesus Christ Superstar (Minack Theatre); Jest End (Jermyn Street Theatre); and Bugsy Malone at the Queens Theatre, (National Youth Music Theatre, 2007).

His concert and cabaret work includes A Spoonful of Sherman, a two-act cabaret show at the St. James Theatre in London (2014); Tony in The Confession Room, also at St. James Theatre (2013); My Fair Lady (RTÉ Concert Orchestra); Strictly Gershwin (Royal Albert Hall); Notes in Heels (Duchess Theatre); Leonard Bernstein Prom (guest soloist); Hooray for Hollywood (guest soloist), MGM Musicals and Rodgers and Hammerstein Prom (BBC/Royal Albert Hall); Sondheim: Inside Out (BBC Concert Orchestra); The Good Companions (BBC Radio 3); performing 'Singin' in the Rain' in Sunday Night at the London Palladium (2010); and various concerts with Jason Robert Brown, Kait Kerrigan and Bree Lowdermilk, Scott Alan and other solo concerts at the St James Studio.

In 2010 Price recorded his début album All Things in Time for SimG Records. The album was a selection of new Musical Theatre songs written by the best contemporary writing talents from both the UK and US including Jason Robert Brown, Georgia Stitt, George Stiles and Anthony Drewe, Dougal Irvine, Laurence Mark Wythe, Scott Alan and others.

Other recordings featuring Price's vocals include: Parade (2007 Donmar Warehouse London Cast Recording); A Spoonful of Sherman (Original London Cast Recording, 2015); The A–Z of Mrs P (Original London Cast Recording, 2014); Scrapbook – The Songs of Rob Archibald and Verity Quade (2010); Scott Alan Greatest Hits (2014); Scott Evan Davis' album Next (2016); More With Every Line by Tim Prottey-Jones (2010); Songs by Richard Beadle and The West End Goes MAD For Christmas (2014).

== Composer ==
Price began composing at the age of 14 and his 1999 musical Searching, written when he was 16, was awarded the Stoll Moss Theatres Award for Most Promising Under 18 Writer as part of the Vivian Ellis Awards. The following year, Price went on to write another musical based on the Pied Piper of Hamelin called Piper, which went on to be a shortlisted finalist for the same prize the year later. Price has written five other musicals including The Diary of Me which was represented at the Perfect Pitch Musicals 2009 West End Showcase. He won the fourth annual Tim Williams' Award in 2011 for his song 'Stories of Heroes' which featured in the Mercury Musical Developments' show Beyond the Gate. In 2012 his song 'If Nobody Knows Your Name' was featured in the show A Song Cycle for Soho. In 2014 Price was commissioned to write the two-hander musical Before After which was workshopped in London that year before opening in Tokyo in Japan in November 2014. The show has been produced 8 times since 2014 in Tokyo alone.

Recordings of Price's penned work include: Before After (Original Studio Cast Recording and Original Japanese Cast Recording, 2016); "Autumn Days" on All Things In Time (2010): "Stories of Heroes" on Beyond The Gate (2011); "If Nobody Knows Your Name" on A Song Cycle for Soho (2012); and "This Christmas" on The West End Goes MAD For Christmas (2014).

He was commissioned by the National Youth Music Theatre to compose the score and lyrics to the book of Timothy Knapman for the musical Imaginary, which was produced in 2017 at The Other Palace. Price released the original NYMT London Cast Recording of Imaginary in late 2017. Price is currently working on two new musicals as well as his own album entitled Melodies & Motion featuring performers from all over the world including Carrie Hope Fletcher, Oliver Ormson, Susan Egan, Heather Lundstedt, Natalie Weiss, Tyrone Huntley, Alex Thomas-Smith, Natasha Barnes, Lauren Samuels, Benjamin Beechey, Richard J. Hunt, Mike Shearer and Rosalie Craig.

== As theatre producer ==
In 2012 with theatrical producer and entrepreneur James Yeoburn he founded the international theatre production company United Theatrical. The pair had worked a year earlier on a concert to celebrate the contribution to the industry made by Dress Circle, a theatre shop in London's Covent Garden selling original cast albums, musical scores and memorabilia. The shop, which had been supporting the industry for 33 years before its closure, was facing financial difficulty. A series of events were planned throughout July and August 2011, with some taking place at the shop and others around London. The series concluded with a West End concert featuring a cast of 50 and an orchestra of 32 at Her Majesty's Theatre on 14 August 2011. Yeoburn and Price assembled an international cast including: Jonathan Ansell, Rosemary Ashe, Julie Atherton, Samantha Barks, Tracie Bennett, Graham Bickley, Simon Bowman, Daniel Boys, Rebecca Caine, Bertie Carvel, Kim Criswell, Alex Gaumond, Ellen Greene, Ramin Karimloo, Robyn North, Lara Pulver, Peter Polycarpou, Joanna Riding, Frances Ruffelle and Hannah Waddingham. The concert reunited the members of the original London casts of the musicals Miss Saigon, The Witches of Eastwick, Parade and Avenue Q.

Price and Yeoburn developed and produced a new musical by American musical theatre composer Scott Evan Davis in 2014 entitled Picture Perfect, starring Lucie Jones. Jones later pulled out of the production owing to scheduling conflicts, and was replaced by Charlotte Wakefield.

In 2016 Yeoburn and Price produced a series of concerts for the London Musical Theatre Orchestra including the Alan Menken and Lynn Ahrens musical version of A Christmas Carol at the Lyceum Theatre. It starred Robert Lindsay as Ebenezer Scrooge, Alex Gaumond as Bob Cratchit, Carrie Hope Fletcher and her sister-in-law Giovanna Fletcher as Emily and Mrs Cratchit, Madalena Alberto as the Ghost of Christmas Past, Hugh Maynard as the Ghost of Christmas Present and Peter Polycarpou as Mr Fezziwig. In 2017 he co-produced the UK tour of The Addams Family Musical. The production was directed by Matthew White and opened at the Edinburgh Festival Theatre on 20 April 2017. It starred Carrie Hope Fletcher as Wednesday, Samantha Womack as Morticia and Les Dennis as Fester. The pair also co-produced the London premiere of Honeymoon in Vegas in a semi-staged concert version at the London Palladium. The LMTO concert, produced by United Theatrical, starred Maxwell Caulfield as Tommy, Samantha Barks as Betsy, Arthur Darvill as Jack, Rosemary Ashe as Bea Singer and Simon Lipkin as Buddy Rocky/Roy Bacon.
