= Music World Corporation =

U.S. music publishing company

- Industry: Music Publishing; Production; Family Entertainment
- Founded: 1958
- Headquarters: Los Angeles, United States of America
- Key people: Robert B. Sherman (Founder); Robert J. Sherman (C.E.O./President)

Music World Corporation is an American music production and music publishing company, representing hundreds of song and music cue titles for a small clientele of composers and lyricists including the company founder. The company was founded in 1958 by Academy Award-winning songwriter Robert B. Sherman.

Music World is based in Los Angeles, California and is affiliated with the performance rights organization BMI.

== Company history ==
Music World was incorporated on January 8, 1958 in the state of California. Within its first year, the company became the first music publisher to cobrand with Wonderland Music Company, Walt Disney Company's then fledgling BMI music publishing subsidiary. Some of Music World's hit song titles include: "Tall Paul", "Bright and Shiny" the Billboard #1 song, "You're Sixteen". "Tall Paul" reached #6 on the Billboard charts in 1959 making it the first top ten single for a solo female rock and roll singer.

In 2000 the company branched into corporate "jingle" publishing, writing and production. Clientele includes Time Warner, Disney, Aero California and others.

Upon the death of founder, Robert B. Sherman on March 6, 2012, his son, Robert J. Sherman succeeded him as CEO and President of the company.

== MusicWorld (UK) and Music World, LLC ==
In 2013 MusicWorld (UK) and Music World, LLC were established as affiliates of MWC. 2013 saw the publishing of its founder, Robert B. Sherman's acclaimed autobiography, Moose: Chapters From My Life by AuthorHouse publishers (an affiliate of Penguin Random House Publications). MusicWorld (UK) produced the successful UK revue presentation A Spoonful of Sherman (2014 - 2017 and the 2018 UK/Ireland tour) and was a producer on Love Birds (2015) and producer of Bumblescratch at the Adelphi starring Darren Day. MWUK has also produced original cast recordings of A Spoonful of Sherman, Love Birds and Bumblescratch which were released on SimG Records.

== Current corporate officers ==
- Robert J. Sherman (CEO and President)
- Robert B. Sherman (Founder)
