= Michael Xavier =

English actor and singer (born 1977)

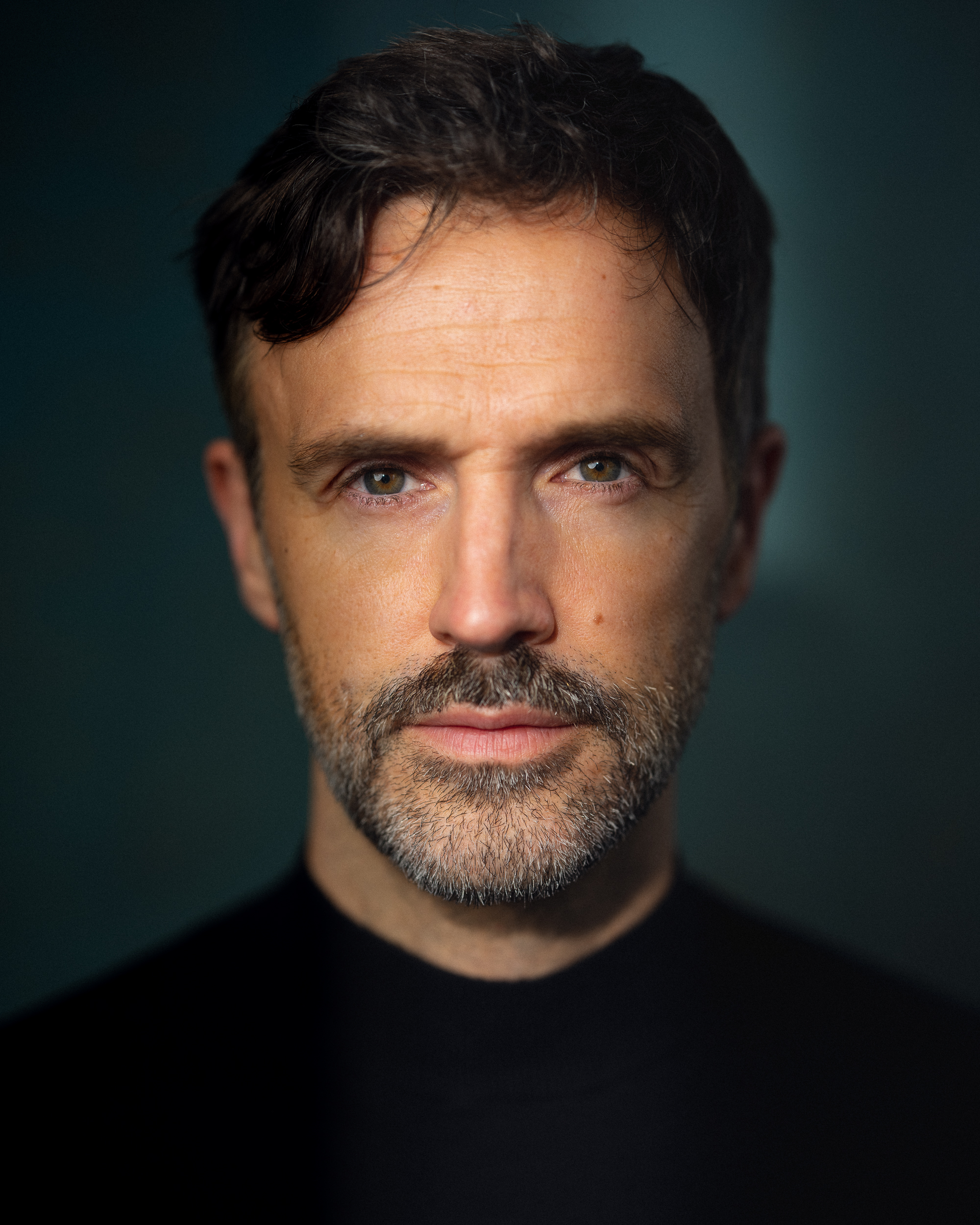
- Born: Michael David Smith; 26 November 1973 (age 52)
- Education: Knutsford Academy; Manchester Metropolitan University
- Occupations: Actor; singer
- Years active: 2000-present
- Website: www.michaelxavier.co.uk

Michael D. Xavier (born Michael David Smith; 26 November 1973) is an English actor and singer. He is a two-time Laurence Olivier Award nominee and has performed on Broadway and in the West End. He’s most well known for his performances in the stage musicals Into the Woods and Sunset Boulevard.

== Early life ==
Michael David Smith (later known as Michael Xavier) attended Knutsford High and ultimately completed his professional acting training at the Manchester Metropolitan University in 1999. His first professional role and London West End debut was in the musical comedy Pageant in 2000.

== Work in theatre ==
Xavier has been nominated twice for a Laurence Olivier Award. He was first nominated for Best Performance in a Supporting Role in a Musical in 2011 for his performance as the Wolf/Cinderella's Prince in Into the Woods at the Regent's Park Open Air Theatre. The same year he was also nominated for the Best Actor in a Musical for his performance as Oliver in the musical Love Story at the Duchess Theatre. In January 2017, Xavier's lead performance in Sunset Boulevard (at the London Coliseum) won the 2016 BroadwayWorld UK/West End Award for Best Actor in a New Production of a Musical.

Xavier has worked in lead roles on stage in the United Kingdom and the United States of America for over 20 years. Notable productions in which he has appeared include Joe Gillis in Sunset Boulevard on Broadway, Prince Of Broadway with the theatre director and producer Harold Prince, Miss Saigon, Freddie Eynsford-Hill and 20 years later Professor Henry Higgins in My Fair Lady, Raoul in The Phantom of the Opera, Curly in Oklahoma!, and Captain von Trapp in The Sound of Music. In 2014, he played Sid Sorokin in The Pajama Game at the Shaftesbury Theatre in London.

In 2008, Xavier played Rock Hudson in Tim Fountain's play Rock at the Unity Theatre in Liverpool, the Library Theatre in Manchester, and the Oval House Theatre in London. It went on to be produced as a radio play by production company Made in Manchester, and won the Best Online Only Audio Drama award at the BBC Audio Drama Awards in 2012.

In October 2026, Xavier will join Don Black's From The Heart revue at the Garrick Theatre.

== Theatre credits ==
Year	Show	Role	Theatre	Director
2000	Pageant	Miss Great Plains	Vaudeville Theatre, West End	Bill Russell
2002-03	My Fair Lady	Freddy Eynsford-Hill	Theatre Royal Drury Lane, West End	Trevor Nunn
2003	Miss Saigon	Ensemble / Alternate Chris	UK Tour	Matthew Ryan
2004	Sunset Boulevard	Artie Green	Cork Opera House	
2004	Mamma Mia!	Sky	International Tour	Phyllida Lloyd / Paul Garrington
2006	The Phantom of the Opera	Raoul, Vicomte de Chagny	Her Majesty's Theatre, West End	Hal Prince
2008	Rock	Rock Hudson	Oval House Theatre, Off-West End	Tamara Harvey
2008-09	Spamalot	Sir Dennis Galahad / The Black Knight / Prince Herbert's Father	Palace Theatre, West End	Mike Nichols
2009	Oklahoma!	Curly	Chichester Festival Theatre	John Doyle
2010	Into the Woods	The Wolf / Cinderella's Prince	Regent's Park Open Air Theatre	Timothy Sheader
2010	Love Story	Oliver	Duchess Theatre, West End	Rachel Kavanagh
2012	Soho Cinders	James Prince	Soho Theatre	Jonathan Butterell
2012	Wonderful Town	Bob Baker	UK No. 1 Tour	Braham Murray
2012	Hello Dolly	Cornelius Hackl	Curve Theatre Leicester	Paul Kerryson
2013	The Sound of Music	Captain Von Trapp	Regent's Park Open Air Theatre	Rachel Kavanagh
2014	The Pajama Game	Sid Sorokin	Shaftesbury Theatre, West End	Richard Eyre
2015	Assassins	John Wilkes Booth	Menier Chocolate Factory, Off-West End	Jamie Lloyd
2015	The War of the Roses	Suffolk / George of Clarence	Rose Theatre Kingston	Trevor Nunn
2015	Showboat	Gaylord	Sheffield Crucible	Daniel Evans
2016	Bumblescratch	Hookbeard	Adelphi Theatre, West End	Stewart Nicholls
2016	The Secret Garden	Lord Archibald Craven	Shakespeare Theatre Company	David Armstrong
2016	Sunset Boulevard	Joe Gillis	London Colliseum, West End (English National Opera)	Lonny Price
2017	Sunset Boulevard	Joe Gillis	Palace Theatre, Broadway	Lonny Price
2017	Prince of Broadway	Featured Performer	Samuel J. Friedman Theatre, Broadway	Hal Prince, Susan Stroman
2021	Love Story	Oliver	Cadogan Hall	Kirk Jameson
2022	Stephen Sondheim's Old Friends	Performer	Sondheim Theatre, West End	Matthew Bourne
2022-23	My Fair Lady	Professor Henry Higgins	UK Tour	Bartlett Sher
2024-25	Mary Poppins	Mr. George Banks	UK & Ireland Tour	Richard Eyre

== Work in television and film ==
Although Xavier started out primarily as a theatre actor, he has also gained many television and film credits including Lieutenant Hamilton Knox in Outlander (Stars), Christopher Miles in The Blacklist (NBC), Dr. Steph Belcombe in Gentleman Jack (BBC) and series regular DCI Elliott Wallace in season 7 and 8 of Grantchester (ITV), as well as roles in Grace (ITV) and The Chelsea Detective (ITV).

Xavier's film work includes his portrayal of Maurice in Hallmark's Paris, Wine & Romance directed by Alex Zamm, Tom in the 2014 production Never Let Go with director Howard J. Ford for Latitude Films. In 2013, he appeared as Rob in the short film Gnomeland by writer/director Francesca Jaynes, as well as playing a Russian Gulag Prisoner in Walt Disney Pictures' Muppets Most Wanted, filmed at Pinewood Studios.

=== Major television and film credits ===
Year	Role	Production	Producer	Director
2015	Tom	Never Let Go	Independent	Howard J. Ford
2019	Maurice	Paris, Wine & Romance	Hallmark	Alex Zamm
2019	Christopher Miles	The Blacklist	NBC	Andrew McCarthy, Michael Caraciollo, Christine Gee
2019-2021	Dr. Steph Belcombe	Gentleman Jack	BBC, HBO	Sally Wainwright, Sarah Harding
2020	Lieutenant Hamilton Knox	Outlander	Starz	Stephen Woolfenden, Meera Menon
2021	Martin Broom	Grace	ITV	Julia Ford
2022	Patrick Thompson	The Chelsea Detective	Alibi	Richard Signy
2022-2023	DCI Elliot Wallace	Grantchester	ITV	Tim Fywell
2023	Hellemans	Hammarskjöld	Patrick Ryborn	Per Fly
2024	Jeremy Zenner	Utopia	Steven Paul	James Bamford

=== Video games ===
Year	Title	Role	Notes
2023	The Isle Tide Hotel	Josh Malone	Interactive film

== Presenting and recording work ==
In 2013, Xavier co-presented the Olivier Awards BBC Radio 2 Covent Garden Stage with Claudia Winkleman, and returned again in 2014 to co-present on the ITV Stage with Myleene Klass. He also hosted the UK Theatre Awards at the historic Guildhall in the City of London in both 2013 and 2014.

In addition, Xavier has worked as a recording artist, with both radio and original soundtrack credits to his name. In 2007, BBC Radio 2 presented a special edition of Friday Night is Music Night, celebrating the work of Leonard Bernstein and the 50th anniversary of West Side Story. Paul Gambaccini presented the program at London's Mermaid Theatre, featuring the BBC Concert Orchestra and Xavier as Tony. He also played Artie Green in the BBC Radio 2 live recording of Sunset Boulevard, performed at the Cork Opera House with Michael Ball and Petula Clark. Outside of radio, his work in recordings includes Bumblescratch (2016 London Concert Cast Recording) Collaborations: The Songs of Elliot Davis (2013), Lift (2012 Concept Album), Soho Cinders (2011 Concert Cast), Love Story (2011 Original London Cast), and Little Women (2004 Studio Cast).

== MX Masterclass ==
Xavier is the Principal of MX Masterclass, a training school for musical theatre students which aims to aid them in gaining acceptance to professional training colleges. The school runs every Sunday, based at Rambert, Upper Ground. Their patrons are Matthew Bourne, Natalie Paris, Emily Carey and Sebastian Croft. Regular teachers over the years have included Anna Tringham, Ross Sharkey, Lucinda Lawrence, Brandon Lee Sears, Nicola Coates, Peter Polycarpou and Alex Young. Students are also taught by guest performers and practitioners including Kerry Ellis, Ramin Karimloo, Rebecca Trehearn, Marc Antolin, Robbie Sherman, Katie Brayben, Louise Dearman, Trevor Dion Nicholas and Matt Henry.

The students are often given an opportunity to perform at various charity and West End events at which Xavier also appears. The students also appear at a Christmas concert at St Paul's, Covent Garden, alongside industry professionals. The 2016 concert was hosted by Rufus Hound.

Students have many performance opportunities throughout the year and gain national and local news coverage in the process. On three occasions they performed at The Best of the West End concert at The Royal Albert Hall starring many big West End names including Xavier himself. They have also performed at Lambert Jackson Productions concerts West End Women and Main Men Of Musicals.
