= A Christmas Held Captive =

Musical

A Christmas Held Captive is an original musical with lyrics and music by Robert J. Sherman and Christopher M. Dawson and book by Lavina Dawson and Michael A. Dawson. The musical officially premiered on December 14, 1986 at the Beverly Hills Playhouse and closed on January 18, 1987. The production was directed by Oliver Muirhead who also played the role of "Constable Scrooge" in the production. Sets and Costumes were designed by Cora Seiler. The music director was composer Christopher Dawson. Vocal direction was done by lyricist, Robert Sherman. Stage Management was done by Lee Doebler. Lighting and sound were supervised by Robert Duncan. The show's corporately sponsored by Mrs. Field's Cookies and privately co-sponsored by John Mazur.

== History of the show ==
Writer Lavina Dawson wrote the script with her older son Michael. Her younger son, award-winning jazz pianist Christopher was then brought on to write music. The three Dawsons then approached Christopher's high school friend, Robbie Sherman to pen the lyrics. Beside co-writing the book and producing the show, Lavina Dawson also played the part of "Mrs. Santa Claus" for select performances during the first run.

== Synopsis ==
It is Christmas Eve and Constable Scrooge has impounded Santa's sleigh. Without the sleigh, Santa Claus can't deliver Christmas presents and the children of the world will be disappointed. Scrooge admits that he impounded the sleigh, then swallows the key to the impound yard where the sleigh is being kept. Mrs. Santa explains to Sugar Plum Fairy that she the reason Constable Scrooge had become so bitter was that she had once rejected Constable Scrooge's romantic gestures and married Santa instead. Now, a love spurned Scrooge has decided to seek revenge upon Santa and Mrs. Claus by ruining Christmas for everyone. The Little Drummer Boy concocts an elaborate plan to save Christmas, forcing Scrooge to spit up the key. The Elves, Sugar Plum, Mrs. Santa and the Drummer Boy succeed in getting the key back and Christmas is saved. A defeated Scrooge confesses that he never gets presents at Christmas. Santa gives Scrooge a present and his spirits are lifted.

== Style ==
The story roughly follows the structure and style of classic British pantomime.

== Songs ==
Source: "A Christmas Held Captive" Score

- "Overture" – Instrumental
- "It's Christmas Time" – Company
- "Let's Go A'Christmassing" - Elves
- "I'm Gonna Rock The World (To The Ground)" – Constable Scrooge and Company
- "Bad Santa Rap" – Santa
- "Sugar Plum King" – Sugar Plum
- "Mrs. Santa's Blues" – Mrs. Santa
- "Good Deed Defenders" – Drummer Boy
- "It's Christmas Time (Finale)" – Company

Note: this is the original song list from the original 1986–87 production.

== Characters and original cast ==
Character	Description	Original Cast	Alternates
Santa Claus	A jolly old, clueless elf who has no idea that his sleigh is missing. This Santa is also a rap singer.	Edwin Cook	
Mrs. Claus	Long suffering wife of Santa. She gets the blues at Christmas because Santa's never around for the holiday.	Dee Marcus	Lavina Dawson
Sugar Plum	Mrs. Santa's ditzy compatriot.	Gracie Moore	
Drummer Boy	The geeky but clever percussionist who comes up with an idea to save Christmas.	Keven Kaye	Michael A. Dawson
Constable Scrooge	The bitter police officer who impounded Santa's sleigh.	Oliver Muirhead	
Green Elf	One of Santa's helpers elves who build toys in anticipation of Christmas.	Bill Moynihan	
Purple Elf	One of Santa's helpers elves who build toys in anticipation of Christmas.	Nancy Gold	
Gold Elf	One of Santa's helpers elves who build toys in anticipation of Christmas.	James MacNerland	
Voice	The off stage, opening and closing narrator.	Alec Murdock	

== Critical reception ==
- "Good feelings rollick along with a very listenable score and performances which celebrate Christmas."
- "Sherman & Dawson give an indication of the freshness with which they might approach their medium in the future."
