= Bumblescratch =

Musical

- 2016 Adelphi Poster
- Music: Robert J. Sherman
- Lyrics: Robert J. Sherman
- Book: Robert J. Sherman
- Productions: 2016 Adelphi Theatre

Bumblescratch is an original sung-through musical with book, music and lyrics by Robert J. Sherman. The musical premiered at the Adelphi Theatre in London on 4 September 2016 as a one night, celebrity gala charity event in aid of Variety, the Children's Charity (UK). This was done as part of weekend commemorations of the 350th anniversary of the Great Fire of London.

The staged concert was directed and choreographed by Stewart Nicholls with music direction by Tom Kelly, orchestrations by Rowland Lee and design by Gabriella Slade.

An Original Cast Recording which includes musical highlights from the show was recorded at Angel Recording Studios on 12–13 September 2016 in Islington, London. The album was mixed and mastered between 14 September – 11 November in Kent and released by SimG Records on 19 December 2016.

In the Adelphi cast were Darren Day, Jessica Martin, Michael Xavier, Ilan Galkoff, Alastair Barron, Jacob Chapman, James Dangerfield, Emma Harold, Katie Kerr, Jessie May, Teddy Moynihan, Cathy Read and Dickie Wood. Prior to this performance, there was a workshop of the show held on 9 and 10 May 2013 at the Network Theatre in London.

== Theme and Inspiration ==
"The characters in Bumblescratch each experience one form of isolation or another. Redemption comes when a character no longer feels isolated. The overarching theme in Bumblescratch is "redemption of the unredeemable". This is why Melbourne had to be a plague rat. Otherwise his redemption would have come across as phony. The audience has to believe that Melbourne is a deeply vile creature, which he is. So when Melbourne rises up, his redemption too becomes plausible."

== Production history ==
The first draft of Bumblescratch was written in the period between 2004 and 2008 when Sherman had first moved to London. It was during this time that his father, Robert B. Sherman of the Sherman Brothers, was working on Chitty Chitty Bang Bang and Mary Poppins for the stage. Sherman later credited the epic scale of Bumblescratch to his exposure to his father's work during this period. Sherman had moved to England to be a support to his father and to manage his business affairs. Sherman said, "When I wasn't managing my father’s office, I was working on Bumblescratch." In 2009, Sherman and his old friend, opera singer, Michael Niemann presented three songs from Bumblescratch as part of a one night, off-Broadway showcase in New York and the songs were very well received.

In November 2012 a weeklong workshop/read-through was conducted and then, six months later, a full workshop was presented of the show. In 2015 the LOST Theatre in Stockwell requested the rights to present the show in 5 week run, but LOST pulled out of the production due to a lack of funds, meanwhile with orchestrations already commissioned and other aspects of the production already underway, Sherman pulled together some of the creative team who did the previous year's well received Love Birds and transformed the production into a one night charity benefit for Variety Club. The show was presented on September 4, 2016 and was in aid of Variety. An Original Cast Recording (CD) including many of the musical highlights from the show was recorded a week after the show and released in December 2016 by SimG Records.

=== 2013 Workshop ===
A workshop of the show was done on May 9 and May 10, 2013 at the Network Theatre in London, England. The workshop cast included: Paul Baker (as "Melbourne"), David Adler (as "Fats"), Rosemary Ashe (as "Bethesda"/"Widow MacGregor"), John Barr (as "Socrates"), Gary Jerry (as "Charmer"), Jeremy Secomb (as "Hookbeard"), Darren Street (as "Thomas Farynor"), James Yeoburn (as "Mordekai"), Ziggie Sky Ward (as "Hortense"), Harry Stone (as "Rufus"), Sebastian Croft (as "Perry"), Daniel Dowling (as "Perry" [understudy]), Frances Encell (as "Thamesa"), and Lydia Grant, Bianca Harris, Stephen Matthews, Sarah Moyle and Sophie Poulton (playing ensemble roles). It was directed by Graham Gill. The Musical Director was Colin Billing. The assistant Musical Director was Matthew Ramplin. Musical Staging was done by Robbie O'Reilly. The Stage Manager was Fiona Bailey. General Management was provided by Joanne Benjamin and Clive Chenery of The Entertainment Business. The Productions Assistant was Stephanie Marks. The Technical Manager was James Henshaw. The Casting Director was Anne Vosser. The children's casting Director was Mark Deitch. Wardrobe was created by Debbie Bennett. Public Relations was done by David Bloom of Target Live. Child Chaperones were David Russell and Doulla Croft. Videography was done by Ramsey Jeffers.

=== 2016 Adelphi ===
In the autumn of 2015, following well received previews of Love Birds at the LOST Theatre and excellent reviews that followed at the Edinburgh Fringe Festival for Love Birds' official run, Robert Sherman was approached by the LOST Theatre in Stockwell for permission to do a four-week, extendable run of Bumblescratch with the associate creative director of LOST, Jack Bowman directing. After several months of preparation Sherman and Bowman were informed that LOST had to withdraw its offer for lack of funding. With orchestrations and other aspects of the show already commissioned, Sherman decided to proceed with a one-night celebrity gala performance in aid of Variety. That show took place on 4 September 2016. The director/choreographer for the Adelphi incarnation of the show was Stewart Nicholls who had collaborated with Sherman on two previous shows Love Birds and A Spoonful of Sherman. Love Birds designer, Gabriella Slade also provided the design for Bumblescratch. Nicholls' long-time associate Rowland Lee was brought on to orchestrate the ten-piece band. Sherman, Nicholls and Lee met regularly from March to August to work on the orchestrations.

== Characters and Cast ==
Character	Description	2013 Workshop Cast	2016 Adelphi Cast
Melbourne Bumblescratch	A plague rat living in 1660s London.	Paul Baker	Darren Day
Perry	An innocent "child" plague rat who becomes Melbourne's only living friend. When he meets a human named "Thamesa" he is instantly smitten.	Sebastian Croft, Daniel Dowling	Ilan Galkoff
Hookbeard	The legendary ghost of a rat pirate. In life he had been the pet of the Viking invader Olav. Hookbeard's curse is that he has no memory of who he is and does not realize that he is a ghost.	Jeremy Secomb	Michael Xavier
Bethesda/Widow MacGregor	Bethesda: The long suffering fiancée of Melbourne Bumblescratch. Widow MacGregor: A sad lady whose life ended gruesomely.	Rosemary Ashe	Jessica Martin
Socrates	The wicked King Rat who rules over the other rats of London.	John Barr	Jacob Chapman
Fats	One of Socrates' henchman. Oafish and dimwitted, he is often seen with "Charmer".	David Adler	Alastair Barron
Charmer	One of Socrates' henchman. Oily and disloyal, he is often seen with "Fats".	Gary Jerry	Dickie Wood
Thamesa	A 15 year old human girl, the daughter of Thomas Farynor, the Royal Baker. When her dog is taken from her, Thamesa takes Perry as a pet.	Frances Encell	Cathy Read
Squabbler	An underdweller rat youth who learns to admire Melbourne, becoming his closest follower and eventually a leader in his own right. "Mordekai" in the 2013 Workshop.	James Yeoburn	Teddy Moynihan
Squeaker	Squabbler's closest minion who is drawn by his magnetism. "Rolanda" in the 2013 Workshop.	Sophie Poulton	Emma Harrold
Thomas Farynor	The Royal Baker. Melbourne lives in the roof thatching of his bakery.	Darren Street	James Dangerfield
Rolanda	One of the female rats of London. A street artiste. "Hortense" in the 2013 Workshop. The character was reworked for the Adelphi production. When Melbourne inadvertently topples her artwork (a cranberry pyramid) it instigates her descent into depression and eventual madness.	Ziggie Sky Ward	Katie Kerr
Lascivia	In the Adelphi cast, this was a single character. "Ensemble" in the 2013 Workshop. This/These character/s are Melbourne's former lovers. At the front Act II of the Adelphi version, Lascivia is experiences a religious transformation.	Lydia Grant, Bianca Harris, Sarah Moyle	Jessie May
Rufus	An incidental historical character from the period who underestimates the danger which the fire represents. (Voice Over)	Harry Stone	James Dangerfield
Samuel Pepys	An incidental (historical) character who underestimates the danger that the fire represents. (Voice Over)	Stephen Matthews	(v/o)
Lord Mayor Bloodworth	An incidental historical character from the period whose inactions the danger which the fire represents.		(v/o)
Judge Satan	The judge who casts down sentence on Melbourne during the nightmare.		Jacob Chapman (v/o)

== Synopsis ==
=== Act I ===
In London, during the Great Plague of 1665, a plague rat named Melbourne Bumblescratch tells stories to (and occasionally steals from) the other rats passing by. Despised for this, Melbourne spends a great deal of his time dodging those whom he has wronged; including his long suffering fiancée, Bethesda; and Socrates who is the King of the Pack Rats. In the first scene, Melbourne inadvertently pickpockets a blue and white jewel from Socrates, thinking that all he was taking was a mere morsel of cheese (London In The Plague) but by the time he realizes what he's stolen, and from whom he's stolen it, it's too late. As he makes his escape, Melbourne meets a juvenile, homeless rat named Perry who takes an instant liking to the storyteller and refuses to leave Melbourne's side (Thank You Sir). The others find and surround Melbourne and Perry when, like a magician, Melbourne sprinkles some "Jiggery Pokery" (gunpowder) on the ground and the twosome disappear into the smoke of the explosion. Just then Bethesda returns, vowing to make Melbourne pay for his treachery (Melbourne Bumblescratch). Contrasting Bethesda's tirade, Melbourne expresses his own, more laid back approach to life (and connubial fidelity) in (At Least A Rat ‘As Got An Excuse).

Meanwhile, Socrates' oafish henchmen, Fats and Charmer, have caught up to Melbourne, following him and Perry into the Cock Lane Rat Pub only to lose the duo once again. Later on, they try to justify their incompetence to Socrates who will hear none of it (Socrates’ Scorn). By the end of the night, Melbourne reluctantly offers Perry (who is still in tow) a place to stay for the night (Close Scrape Today). As Melbourne falls asleep, he has nightmares of being tortured by Socrates when suddenly he is awoken by his recurring hallucination: Hookbeard, the amnesiac ghost of a legendary rat pirate (Hookbeard's Theme). Melbourne explains to the audience that the reason for his hallucinations is because of his long-ago consumption of tainted cheese (Don't Eat Bad Cheese!). He explains that the Bad Cheese made him just a little crazy, but that the insanity is manageable. Hookbeard chastises Melbourne for stealing Socrates's jewel, insisting Melbourne give it back for his own good. Melbourne lies to Hookbeard telling him that he can't give back the jewel, "much as he'd like" due to the jewel being lost. The justifiably skeptical ghost takes pity on Melbourne, promising to protect him should his location be discovered by the Socrates (Hookbeard's Rebuke).

Waking from his hallucination, mid-chase, Melbourne realizes that he and Perry are fleeing from Socrates and his minions at that very minute! They escape into a church. Perry becomes mesmerized by the grand architecture and colored light produced by the stained glass. Jaded Melbourne is unimpressed. (Can You Hear The Music?). Just then Perry and Melbourne are kidnapped by a dangerous gang of troglodytic rats. (Storyteller) It turns out that because they live underground, the Underdweller rats love to hear stories about "the above world". Egged on by Perry, Melbourne tells them the most gruesome tale he knows: The saga of (The Widow MacGregor) - a destitute woman of ill-repute whose dead carcass was devoured by a single, mysterious rat over a long, cold winter. The Underdwellers delight in Melbourne's revolting tale so much that they don't notice when he and Perry suddenly vanish - Melbourne once again using his stolen gunpowder to provide cover for their escape (Jiggery Pokery).

Back at Melbourne's nest, which is concealed in the thatching of Royal Baker Thomas Farynor's home and bakery, Perry encounters the baker's daughter, who thinks Perry is cute and takes him as her pet (What Is This That I See). Perry is instantly smitten (Adorable Me!). Melbourne disapproves of the relationship, insisting Perry break it off. Perry refuses. (Unhand Me!). He struggles with his new found feelings for Thamesa (That's Something) coming to the conclusion that Melbourne is the one with the problem, not him. Perry declares that Melbourne "Is an unfaithful creature." Astonished this declaration, Melbourne insists that he's "the most faithful creature in all of London". Just as him makes his declaration, he is confronted by a number of former lovers including Bethesda (Melbourne Bumblescratch - Reprise) whose complaints show the love rat in a very different light. Suddenly surrounded, Melbourne grabs onto the leg of a raven who flies off with him. Mid-air he realizes he'll either be killed by being dropped or by being eaten alive by the bird once they've landed. In desperation, Melbourne prays to God, something he's not done before. Miraculously, a swarm of albino bats scares off the raven and Melbourne's life is spared. Humbly Melbourne sings (The Music of the Spheres).

Melbourne seeks out Perry who, in the interim, had returned to Thamesa's home (And One Day/We’ve Got To Get Out of This Place!) and subsequently suffered a mortal wound by the hand of Thamesa's father, Thomas Farynor. Finding Perry near death, Melbourne vows to protect Thamesa from "the wickedness of the world" (Dual Epiphany). Heartbroken, Melbourne tucks the diamond he'd stolen from Socrates into Perry's lifeless palm vowing to live a more noble life in honor him (My Place In the Sun).

=== Act II ===
Melbourne's storytelling prowess proves useful in gaining followers (All Fallen Angels) and Bethesda is brushed to the side. Socrates too, has lost most of his pack's loyalty to Melbourne's new message of hope. Socrates prepares a trap for Melbourne that he believes will bear the storyteller out as a fraud (Socrates’ Ploy). Squabbler and Rufus bring Melbourne the news that Thamesa is about to die, a victim of the plague (News of Thamesa's Imminent Demise). In an effort to at least partially fulfill Perry's dying wish, that he "protect Thamesa from the wickedness of this world, Melbourne visits the sick girl and suddenly sees beyond her disfigured appearance, discovering the inner beauty which Perry saw easily. He renews his pledge to protect her, even in death (Beautiful Now). Not wanting to endanger his young followers, Melbourne once again conjures up Hookbeard, beckoning his help. Together they fend off would be scavenger rats at the Churchyard of St. Ghastly Grim. Having done a noble deed, Hookbeard suddenly regains his memory and ascends to the next world" (Hookbeard’s Theme (Reprise Part 1)/Let Us Pass/Hookbeard's Theme (Reprise Part 2).

Without Hookbeard or Perry, Melbourne acknowledges that he can't live in the past or dream about the future, but must focus on "the now" (The Present Tense). But all alone, he quickly falls into Socrates’ tainted cheese trap (Ain’t That Just the Whiff?). He takes the bait and eats the tainted cheese and is shortly thereafter overwhelmed by a guilt spawned hallucination (Bumblescratch Nightmare). His worst fears manifest, Melbourne must now face the Widow MacGregor's ghoulish spirit and admit culpability for his crimes against her. Amazingly, when he faces her and admits his regret, Melbourne discovers that the Widow holds no grudge against him, indeed she is grateful to him (Long Long Road). However, as Melbourne's delirium subsides, and Socrates shows his once zealous minions the defiled state in which Melbourne has stooped. Squabbler and the others become disillusioned with Melbourne but instead of returning to Socrates' fold, they decide to go leaderless. Anarchy ensues (We Will Live To Be Free). Without any allies left to assist him, Melbourne tries to get away from Socrates and the others unnoticed (S'ppose I Should Have Seen It Coming). But Socrates, Fats and Charmer stop him. Melbourne tells Socrates that he can die, satisfied in the knowledge that while he may have lost control of the rats, so has Socrates (Kill Me Now). Socrates reveals that he never wanted to kill Melbourne. Rather, he wants Melbourne to use his great thieving talents in order to execute a heist on his behalf – to steal the crown jewel from King Charles II. Socrates details how the heist will be accomplished (Farynor).

Melbourne realizes that he must decide, once and for all, whether he will live by the virtues of sin or of righteousness. The ghosts of Perry and Hookbeard remind Melbourne that there is, indeed a third option for a rat: "The Ratly Path of Compromise!" (Dance Dance Dance). With that, Melbourne agrees to do the heist. True to form, Melbourne successfully steals Charles’ jewel from the Tower of London, escaping unscathed, only to discover that all the city is ablaze due to a fire he had inadvertently started. Melbourne rushes to rescue Bethesda when Socrates confronts him and demands the jewel he had just stolen. Melbourne lies to Socrates, telling him that he lost the jewel. Fire raging in the background, the rivals engage in combat. Tragically, Socrates catches fire and, refusing Melbourne's help, burns to death (Blackness Fills the Night). By dawn, the city is in cinders, dead rats blanket the ground. Noting the death of the rodents coinciding with the end of the plague, the Londoners come to the horrible realization that it was the rats who'd been the cause of the plague all along (All the Rats Are Dead). A woman cries out, "Plague Rat!" as the sole rat survivors, Melbourne and Bethesda, drift down the Thames on Hookbeard's boat. Melbourne takes the condemnation in stride, having accepted his role in the world. Lovingly he gives Bethesda the jewel he'd stolen from King Charles and lied about to Socrates, as the twosome continue their easterly adventure, sailing bravely into the rising sun of morning (Plague Rat/Epilogue).

== Musical Numbers ==
Act I

- 1. "London In the Plague" – Melbourne, Perry, Bethesda, Company
- 2. "Overture"
- 3. "Thank You Sir" – Melbourne, Perry, Rolanda, Fats, Charmer, Company
- 4. "Melbourne Bumblescratch" – Bethesda
- 5. "At Least A Rat 'As Got An Excuse" – Melbourne, Perry, Fats, Company
- 6. "Socrates' Scorn" – Socrates, Squabbler, Charmer, Fats
- 7. "Close Scrape Today" – Melbourne, Perry
- 8. "Hookbeard's Theme" – Hookbeard, Company
- 9. "Don't Eat Bad Cheese" – Melbourne
- 10. "Hookbeard's Rebuke" – Hookbeard, Melbourne
- 11. "Can't You Hear The Music?" – Perry, Melbourne
- 12. "Storyteller" (recitative) – Underdwellers, Squabbler
- 13. "Widow MacGregor" / "Storyteller" (song)
- 14. "Jiggery Pokery" – Melbourne, Perry
- 15. "What Is This That I See?" – Thamesa, Perry
- 16. "Adorable Me!" – Perry
- 17. "Unhand Me!" – Melbourne, Perry
- 18. "That's Something" – Perry
- 19. "I Figured Out Your Problem"
- 20. "Music Of The Spheres" – Melbourne
- 21. "We've Got To Get Out Of This Place"
- 22. "Dual Epiphany" – Melbourne, Perry
- 23. "My Place In The Sun" – Melbourne

Act II

- 24. "All Fallen Angels" – Melbourne, Bethesda, Company
- 25. "News Of Thamesa's Imminent Demise" – Squabbler, Rufus, Melbourne, Socrates
- 26. "Beautiful Now" – Thamesa, Melbourne
- 27. "I Cannot Hear You" – Melbourne, Hookbeard
- 28. "Hookbeard's Theme" (Reprise pt. 1) / "Let Us Pass" / "Hookbeard's Theme" (Reprise pt. 2) – Hookbeard, Melbourne, Ravenous Rats
- 29. "The Present Tense" / "Ain't That Just The Whiff" – Melbourne
- 30. "Nightmare" – Company, Melbourne, Perry, Judge Satan
- 31. "Long Long Road" – Widow MacGregor, Company
- 32. "We Will Live To Be Free" – Squabbler, Socrates
- 33. "Socrates' Grand Ploy" – Socrates
- 34. "Dance Dance Dance" – Melbourne, Perry, Hookbeard
- 35. "Blackness Fills The Night" – Company
- 36. "All The Rats Are Dead" – Company
- 37. "Plague Rat!" – Melbourne, Bethesda
- 38. "Epilogue" – Melbourne

=== Orchestration ===
- Reed 1: Piccolo, Flute, Clarinet, Alto Saxophone
- Reed 2: Flute, Oboe, Clarinet, Bass Clarinet, Tenor Saxophone
- Trumpet/Flugelhorn
- Trombone
- Violin
- Cello
- String Bass/Electric Bass
- Guitar/Banjo/ Electric Guitar
- Drum Kit/Timpani/Tuned percussion (Glockenspiel, Vibraphone, Chimes)
- Keyboard

=== Cut Musical Numbers ===
The following is a list of numbers (or partially written numbers) either for the 2013 workshop or for the 2016 Adelphi production.

Act I

- 1. Everybody Hide – Fats, Charmer
- 2. Ring-A-Ring-A-Rosy – Thamesa
- 3. Go To Sleep, Sweet Plague Rat – Melbourne
- 4. Bring Out Your Dead – Body Collector, Chorus
- 5. I Want To Believe In Love – Perry
- 6. Where Did He Go? – Melbourne, Bethesda
- 7. Really Rather Strange – Melbourne, Bethesda
- 8. I'm Faithful (To All My Lovers) – Melbourne, Bethesda
- 9. (Tell Me) What's A Good Ol' Boy To Do – Melbourne
- 10. Always A Test – Hookbeard, Melbourne
- 11. Good At Being Gruesome – Perry, Thamesa
- 12. The Plague's The Thing – Ponchus, Judas

Act II

- 13. Oh What A Lovely Plague! – Chorus
- 14. The Sun Is Shining In My Head – Mordekai (aka Squabbler)
- 15. Bethesda's Drunken Lament – Bethesda
- 16. It's Depressing – Socrates
- 17. Many Different Ways To Skin A Rat – Socrates, Caspian

== London Concert Cast Recording ==
Bumblescratch London Cast Recording (2016).

The Bumblescratch London Concert Cast Recording was recorded on 12 and 13 September 2016 with final mixes completed on 4 November 2016. The CD was produced by Robert Sherman, Tom Kelly and Rowland Lee. It was recorded at Angel Recording Studios in Islington, London. The CD was originally scheduled for release by SimG Records in late October 2016, with pre-orders available from 3 September. however the release was delayed due to scheduling conflicts. The subsequent release date was moved to 19 December 2016 and will be available digitally on iTunes in early 2017. The CD was engineered and mixed by Niall John Acott. The mix sessions were done at NJA Studios in Maidstone, Kent between 14 September – 4 November 2016. Mastering was done in Canterbury, Kent on 10 and 11 November. The CD was mastered by Kevin Porée.

=== Track listing ===
All music is composed by Robert J. Sherman.

Bumblescratch (Original Adelphi Cast Recording)
No.	Title	Lead vocals	Length
1.	"London In The Plague"	Darren Day, Ilan Galkoff, Jessica Martin, Jacob Chapman, Emma Harrold, Katie Kerr, Jessie May, Cathy Read, Alastair Barron, James Dangerfield, Teddy Moynihan, Dickie Wood	7:16
2.	"Thank You Sir"	Darren Day, Ilan Galkoff, Emma Harrold, Katie Kerr, Jessie May, Cathy Read, Alastair Barron, James Dangerfield, Teddy Moynihan, Dickie Wood	3:10
3.	"Melbourne Bumblescratch"	Jessica Martin, Ensemble	1:49
4.	"At Least A Rat 'As Got An Excuse"	Darren Day, Ilan Galkoff, Alastair Barron, Ensemble	4:02
5.	"Socrates' Scorn"	Jacob Chapman, Alastair Barron, Teddy Moynihan, Dickie Wood	2:11
6.	"Close Scrape Today"	Darren Day, Ilan Galkoff,	3:53
7.	"Hookbeard's Theme"	Michael Xavier, Ensemble	2:43
8.	"Can You Hear The Music?"	Darren Day, Ilan Galkoff	1:38
9.	"Jiggery Pokery"	Darren Day, Ilan Galkoff	2:44
10.	"What Is This That I See?"	Ilan Galkoff, Cathy Read	1:47
11.	"Adorable Me!"	Ilan Galkoff, Darren Day	3:17
12.	"That's Something"	Ilan Galkoff	1:36
13.	"Music Of The Spheres"	Darren Day	1:52
14.	"Dual Epiphany"	Darren Day, Ilan Galkoff	2:14
15.	"My Place In The Sun"	Darren Day, Ensemble	4:54
16.	"Beautiful Now"	Cathy Read, Darren Day	2:06
17.	"I Cannot Hear You"	Michael Xavier, Darren Day	2:37
18.	"Hookbeard's Theme (Reprise Part 1)/Let Us Pass/Hookbeard's Theme (Reprise Part 2)"	Michael Xavier, Katie Kerr, Dickie Wood, Alastair Barron, Darren Day	2:57
19.	"Nightmare"	Darren Day, Ilan Galkoff, Jacob Chapman, Ensemble	3:50
20.	"Long Long Road"	Jessica Martin, Ensemble	3:49
21.	"Socrates Presents His Plan"	Jacob Chapman, Darren Day, Alastair Barron, Dickie Wood	3:34
22.	"Dance! Dance! Dance!"	Darren Day, Michael Xavier, Ilan Galkoff	3:18
23.	"Blackness Fills The Night"	Darren Day, Jacob Chapman, Ensemble	2:08
24.	"Plague Rat"	Darren Day, Jessica Martin, Ensemble	4:09
25.	"Tail"	Ensemble	0:18
Total length:			73:59

== Critical response ==
Critical response for Bumblescratch at the Adelphi was generally positive. Independent bloggers' reviews were varied.

- Emma Clarendon of Love London Love Culture gave Bumblescratch five stars writing: "Bumblescratch has real potential to become a really joyful family show with its sheer imagination and wonderful variety of characters that will keep children engrossed from beginning to end. Wonderful evening’s entertainment."
- Kara Alberts of West End Wilma gave Bumblescratch four stars writing: "Some of the best loved musicals of all time have come from the Shermans. They are true classics, and I think Robert J. Sherman’s Bumblescratch could be on its way to being just that. Darren Day is an example of how casting directors can really get this right...it has to be said that Darren Day really takes the role with both hands, and I can’t imagine a better or more deserving actor receiving this role. This is the same with Ilan Galkoff, (Perry) a young and exceptionally talented performer. For a boy of 12, he is an extremely impressive force to be reckoned with and his character’s wonderful relationship with Bumblescratch works brilliantly, as the duo play off each other with ease. The pair are completely heartwarming...I think Bumblescratch holds its own in a genre of well known and loved musicals, and I am excited to see how it will develop, as I think it could perhaps become a new classic."
- Craig Glenday from Musical Theatre Review gave Bumblescratch four stars. "At the core of this big, goofy, ambitious show beats a warm heart, with memorable characters and a delightful score... '[Bumblescratch]' is full to bursting with novel ideas."
- Daniella of The Mortal Fool gave Bumblescratch four stars stating: "Darren Day, who took on the majority of the vocal work as the titular character, had charisma and cockney charm, and held some great audience interaction. Ilan Galkoff, as Perry, the small rat who accompanies Bumblescratch, is a phenomenon. Galkoff has such energy and holds himself very well on the stage, and is a standout from the second he makes his entrance. His voice is also very strong, as proven in his solo “Adorable Me!” which is, of course, very adorable. I cannot praise Galkoff enough. Jessica Martin as Bumblescratch's long-suffering fiancée Bethesda was great when on stage...Members of the ensemble Katie Kerr and Teddy Moynihan also stood out to me with their facial expressions, comic timing, and dance skills....[Bumblescratch] is full of catchy songs, funny lyrics, and a lot of heart."
- Chris Omaweng of LondonTheatre1.com gave the London Concert Cast Recording of Bumblescratch four stars stating: "Two soaring melodies, in reasonably quick succession, are worthy of note, ‘Music of The Spheres’ and ‘My Place In The Sun’, both delivered the big and bold manner so beloved by West End and Broadway audiences...There's something for all the family in this recording, with hummable and memorable choruses...Overall, the variation in tempo and style of musical numbers is excellent, and there's a vitality in this recording that makes it a pleasure to listen to."

== In popular culture ==
On 20 March 2018 on the popular American quiz show, Jeopardy!, the host Alex Trebek supplied the statement: "Bumblescratch, set in 1665-1666 London starts with a plague and ends with this other disaster." to which the contestant correctly posited, "What is the Great Fire of London?"
