= Ben Watton =

British actor (born 1995)

- Born: Ben Watton; 28 July 1995 (age 31); Bournemouth, Dorset, England, United Kingdom
- Occupation: Actor And Drummer
- Years active: 2001–present

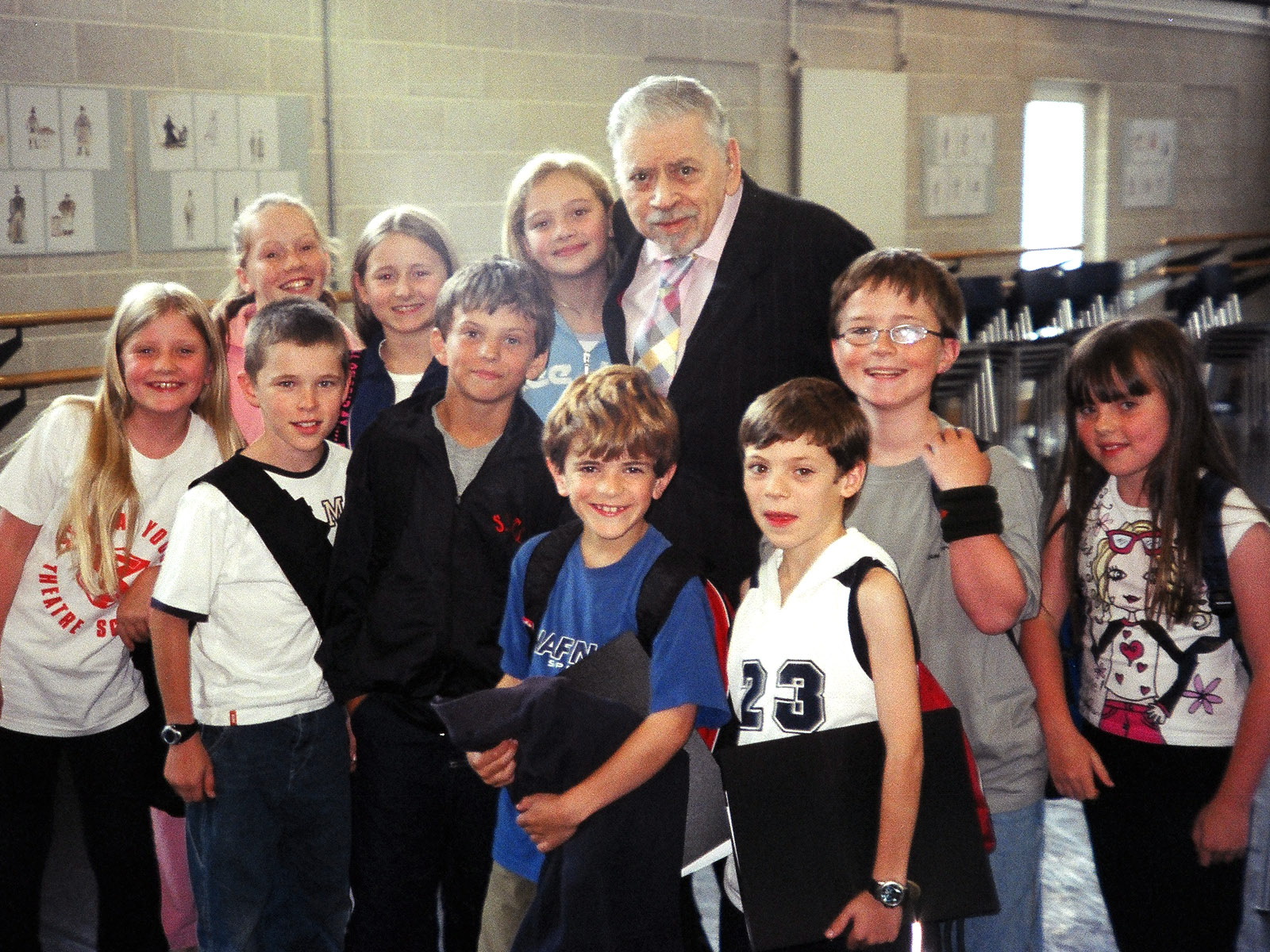
Original London cast - "Janes & Michaels". Left to right (front): Poppy Lee Friar, Jack Montgomery, Perry Millward, Harry Stott, Ben Watton, Jake Catterall, Nicola Bowman. Left to right (back): Charlotte Spencer, Faye Spittlehouse, Carrie Fletcher and songwriter, Robert B. Sherman.

Ben Watton (born 28 July 1995) is an English former child actor and the drummer for the band Galaxy Thief from Bournemouth, Dorset, England.

== Theatre ==
Ben Watton's first professional stage appearance was at the age of 6, appearing as a mini Bobby Ball opposite the comedians Cannon and Ball in A Night of a Thousand Laughs at the Pavilion Theatre in Bournemouth. At age 7, he was chosen to play Tiny Tim in a new musical adaptation of Scrooge with Jakes Ladder Theatre Company, a small professional company, at Bryanston Arts Centre in Blandford and at the Tivoli Theatre in Wimborne, under the direction of Steve Eaton-Evans. At age 8, he played Michael Darling in a Michael Rose musical production of Peter Pan at the Lighthouse, Poole, alongside Matthew Kelly, Tracey Childs and Michael Medwin, under the direction of Michael Rose and David Morgan.

Watton made his West End debut aged 9, having been chosen at age 8 from nationwide open auditions to play Michael Banks in the original cast of the Disney/Cameron Mackintosh musical Mary Poppins, appearing at both the Bristol Hippodrome and the Prince Edward Theatre in the West End, under the direction of Richard Eyre and Matthew Bourne.

He appeared in November 2005 as the Court Jester in the world premiere of George and the Fairytale, a play co-written and directed by the actress Sandra Dickinson and her partner Mark Osmond. In 2006-2007 he played the juvenile lead in Robin Hood & The Babes in the Wood for UK Productions, at the Pavilion Theatre in Bournemouth.

He is also an accomplished drummer. On 9 January 2014, Watton joined the Bournemouth-based Mod band The Generation. He was a member of Bournemouth-based rock/pop cover band Mr Wiseguy between 2013 and 2016, and is now the drummer for the up-and-coming rock/indie/pop band Galaxy Thief.

== Film and television ==
Watton's TV credits include the part of Andrew in the CBBC drama Living It, the part of Fernando in Series 7 of the popular children's sitcom My Parents Are Aliens, and the part of Peter Masterson in the long-running BBC hospital-drama Casualty. He was also chosen to appear in a lead role in a performed reading of the pilot of a new children's sitcom, performed at a live Granada TV Showcase in London, and also featured in the 2006 Are You There Yet? BBC ident. He was involved in a script reading at Elstree Studios of the feature film Rocket Boy, reading the principal role of Davey.

He has appeared in 14 short films, taking the leading role in five.

Watton also appears in leading roles in two separate series of educational DVDs, both now being used in various European countries to teach English to foreign students.
