= Robert B. Sherman =

American songwriter (1925–2012)

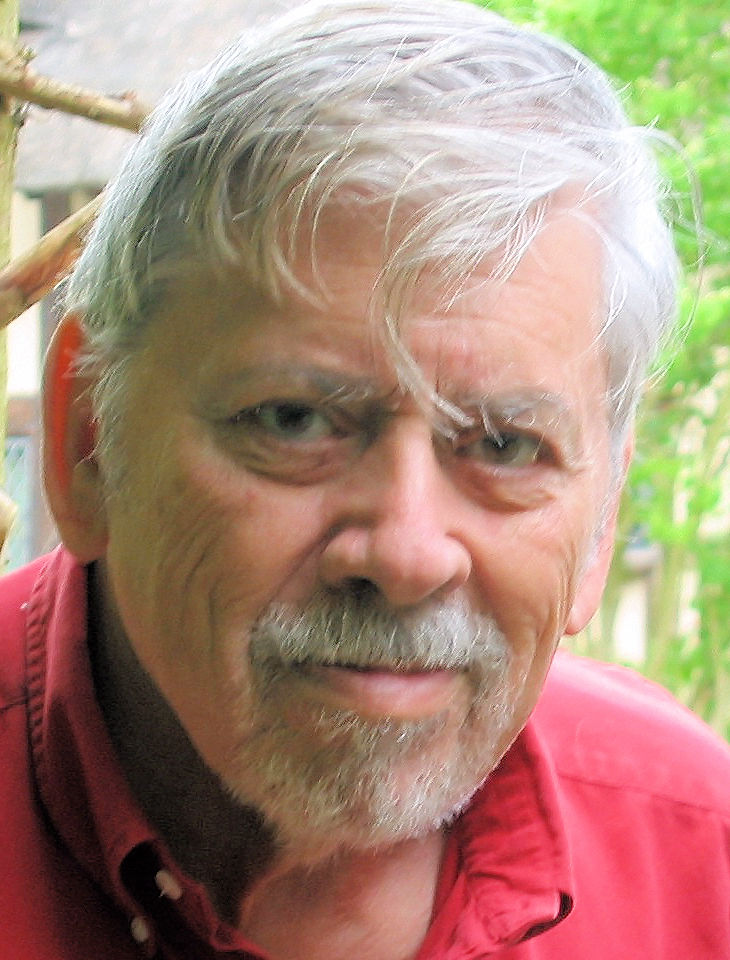
- Sherman in 2002
- Born: Robert Bernard Sherman; December 19, 1925; New York City, U.S.
- Died: March 6, 2012 (aged 86); London, England
- Resting place: Hillside Memorial Park Cemetery, Culver City, California
- Other names: Bob Sherman "Moose"
- Occupation: Songwriter
- Years active: 1950–2012
- Spouse: Joyce Ruth Sasner (m. 1953; died 2001)
- Children: 4, including Robert
- Relatives: Richard M. Sherman (brother); Al Sherman (father)
- Musical career
- Genres: Film score; Children's music
- Instruments: Vocals

Robert Bernard Sherman (December 19, 1925 – March 6, 2012) was an American songwriter. Best known for his work in musical films with his brother, Richard M. Sherman, they, known as Sherman brothers, produced more motion picture song scores than any other songwriting team in film history. Some of their songs were incorporated into live action and animation musical films including Mary Poppins, The Happiest Millionaire, The Sword in the Stone, The Jungle Book, The Many Adventures of Winnie the Pooh, Chitty Chitty Bang Bang, The Slipper and the Rose, and Charlotte's Web. Their best-known work is "It's a Small World (After All)" possibly the most-performed song (in public) in history.

== Early life ==
Robert Bernard Sherman was born on December 19, 1925, in New York City to Russian Jewish immigrants Rosa (Dancis) and Al Sherman. Al Sherman, a songwriter, paid for his son's hospital delivery costs with a royalty check that arrived that day for the song "Save Your Sorrow". His brother and songwriting partner, Richard, was born in 1928. Sherman's father was a well-known Tin Pan Alley songwriter.

In his youth, Sherman excelled in violin, piano, painting and poetry. Following seven years of cross-country moves, the Shermans settled down in Beverly Hills, California. Some of the primary schools Sherman attended in Manhattan included PS 241 and the Ethical Culture Fieldston School, and in California, the El Rodeo School. At Beverly Hills High School, Sherman wrote and produced radio and stage programs for which he won much acclaim. At age 16, Sherman wrote Armistice and Dedication Day, a stage play showing how American life was changed following the December 7, 1941 attack on Pearl Harbor. The play yielded thousands of dollars for war bonds and earned a special citation from the War Department.

== World War II ==
In 1943, Sherman obtained permission from his parents to join the army at age 17. Sherman was awarded the Purple Heart medal after being shot in the knee on April 12, 1945, an injury which forced him to walk with a cane for the rest of his life. On April 29, 1945, Sherman was among the first soldiers who entered the Dachau concentration camp. Other medals received by Sherman for service in the war were the Bronze Star Medal, the Combat Infantryman Badge, two Battle Stars for his European-African-Middle Eastern Campaign Medal, an American Campaign Medal, a World War II Victory Medal, and a Good Conduct Medal, and several Army Weapons Qualifications badges.

While recuperating from his knee injury in Taunton and Bournemouth in England, Sherman became familiar with the United Kingdom and its culture.

== Awards and decorations ==
During World War II, Robert B. Sherman received these awards:

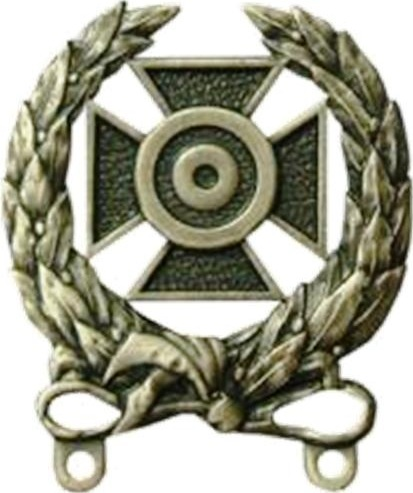
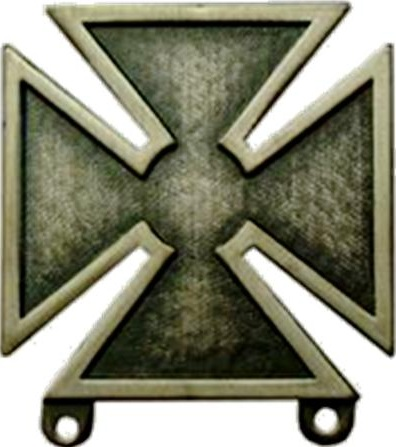
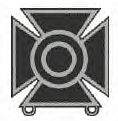

Combat Infantry Badge
Purple Heart		Good Conduct Medal
American Campaign Medal	European-African-Middle Eastern; Campaign Medal with two stars	World War II Victory Medal
Marksmanship Badges

== Education ==
Upon his return to the United States, Sherman attended Bard College in upstate New York where he majored in English literature and painting. Sherman served as editor-in-chief of Bard College's campus newspaper, The Bardian. At Bard, Sherman completed his first two novels, The Best Estate and Music, Candy and Painted Eggs. He graduated in 1949.

On May 12, 1990, Sherman received an honorary doctorate from Lincoln College.

== Songwriting career ==
Sherman and his brother, Richard, began writing songs together on a challenge from their father, Al Sherman, who was a Tin Pan Alley songwriter ("No! No! A Thousand Times No!!", "You Gotta Be a Football Hero").

In 1958, Sherman founded the music publishing company, Music World Corporation, which later worked with Disney's BMI publishing arm, Wonderland Music Company. That same year, the Sherman brothers had their first Top 10 hit with "Tall Paul", sung by Annette Funicello. The success of this song attracted the attention of Walt Disney, who hired the Sherman Brothers as staff songwriters for Walt Disney Studios. While at Disney, the Sherman Brothers wrote their most-recognized song, "It's a Small World (After All)" for the 1964 New York World's Fair.

In 1965, the Sherman brothers won two Academy Awards for Mary Poppins, Best Original Score and Best Original Song, "Chim Chim Cher-ee". Since Mary Poppins' premiere, Sherman earned nine Academy Award nominations, two Grammy Awards, four Grammy Award nominations and 23 gold and platinum albums. Starting with this movie, and continuing through several subsequent Disney movies, the Sherman Brothers collaborated with noted arranger-conductor Irwin Kostal.

Robert and Richard Sherman worked for Walt Disney until Disney's death in 1966. After leaving the company, the brothers worked freelance as songwriters on scores of motion pictures, television shows, theme park exhibits and stage musicals.

Their first non-Disney assignment was in 1968 in Albert R. Broccoli's motion picture Chitty Chitty Bang Bang, which garnered the brothers their third Academy Award nomination. In 1973, the Sherman brothers made history by becoming the only Americans ever to win first prize at the Moscow Film Festival for Tom Sawyer, for which they authored the screenplay.

In 1976, The Slipper and the Rose was picked to be the Royal Command Performance of the year, attended by Queen Elizabeth. A musical adaptation of Cinderella, The Slipper and the Rose features both song, score and screenplay by the Sherman brothers. That same year the Sherman brothers received a star on the Hollywood "Walk of Fame" across from Grauman's Chinese Theater.

Other box office film credits for the Sherman brothers include The Jungle Book (1967), The Aristocats (1970), The Parent Trap (1961), The Parent Trap (1998), Charlotte's Web (1973), The Many Adventures of Winnie the Pooh (1977), Snoopy Come Home (1972), Bedknobs and Broomsticks (1971) and Little Nemo: Adventures In Slumberland (1992).

In 1974, the Sherman brothers' Tony-nominated Over Here! (1974) was the highest-grossing original Broadway musical of that year. The Sherman brothers wrote popular songs, including "You're Sixteen", which reached Billboard's Top 10 twice, with Johnny Burnette in 1960 and with Ringo Starr 14 years later, "Pineapple Princess" and "Let's Get Together".

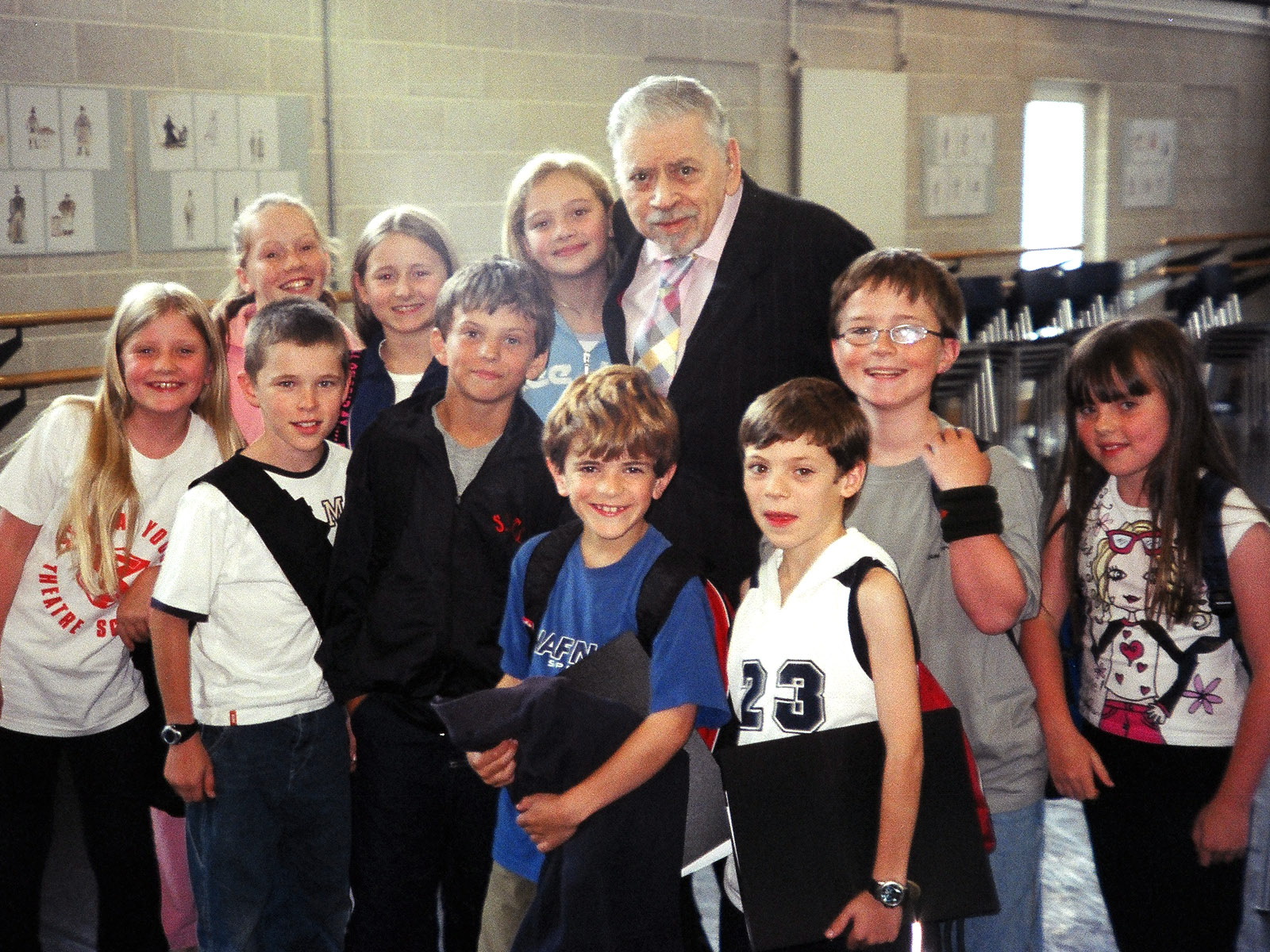
Original London cast - "Janes and Michaels". Left to right (Front): Poppy Lee Friar, Jack Montgomery, Perry Millward, Harry Stott, Ben Watton, Jake Catterall, Nicola Bowman. Left to right (BACK): Charlotte Spencer, Faye Spittlehouse, Carrie Hope Fletcher, Robert B. Sherman. (Photo: July 19, 2004)

In 2000, the Sherman brothers wrote the score for Disney's blockbuster film The Tigger Movie, their first major motion picture for Disney in more than 28 years.

In 2002, the stage musical Chitty Chitty Bang Bang became the most successful stage show produced at the London Palladium. In 2005, it premiered on Broadway at the Foxwoods Theatre (then the Hilton Theatre). The Sherman brothers wrote an additional six songs for the new stage productions.

In 2002, Sherman moved from Beverly Hills to London, England, where he continued to write and paint. In 2003, four Sherman brothers' musicals ranked in the "Top 10 Favorite Children's Films of All Time" in a British poll reported by the BBC. The Jungle Book (1967) ranked at No. 7, Mary Poppins (1964) ranked at No. 8, The Aristocats (1970) ranked at No. 9 and Chitty Chitty Bang Bang (1968) ranked at No. 1.

A Disney and Cameron Mackintosh production of Mary Poppins: The Stage Musical that premiered at the Prince Edward Theatre in December 2004 featured the Sherman brothers' classic songs.

In June 2005, Sherman was inducted into the Songwriters Hall of Fame with his brother, Richard. Also in June 2005, a tribute was paid to Sherman at the Théâtre de Vevey in Vevey, Switzerland by the Ballet Romand.

In 2006, Mary Poppins opened on Broadway and embarked on a world tour beginning in Göteborg, Sweden in 2008.

Chitty Chitty Bang Bang embarked on a tour of 29 cities in the U.S., ending in 2009.

== Personal life ==
=== Marriage and family ===
Sherman married Ilse Louise Hayes in Elkton, Maryland in 1948; the marriage was annulled in South Norwalk, Connecticut in 1950.

Sherman then married Joyce Ruth Sasner in California in 1953. Their first child, Laurie (b. 1955) was followed by Jeffrey (b. 1957), Andrea (1960–2019) and Robert (b. 1968).

After Sherman's 2002 relocation to London, he and his brother, Richard, continued to collaborate on various musical plays, as well as a feature, animated, film musicals which incorporates their original story, song score and screenplay. The brothers traveled between Los Angeles, New York and London to facilitate their work.

Sherman died in London on March 6, 2012. His wife preceded him in death by 11 years. His funeral service was held for Sherman on March 9, 2012, at Hillside Memorial Park and Mortuary in Culver City.

=== Painting and other artistry ===
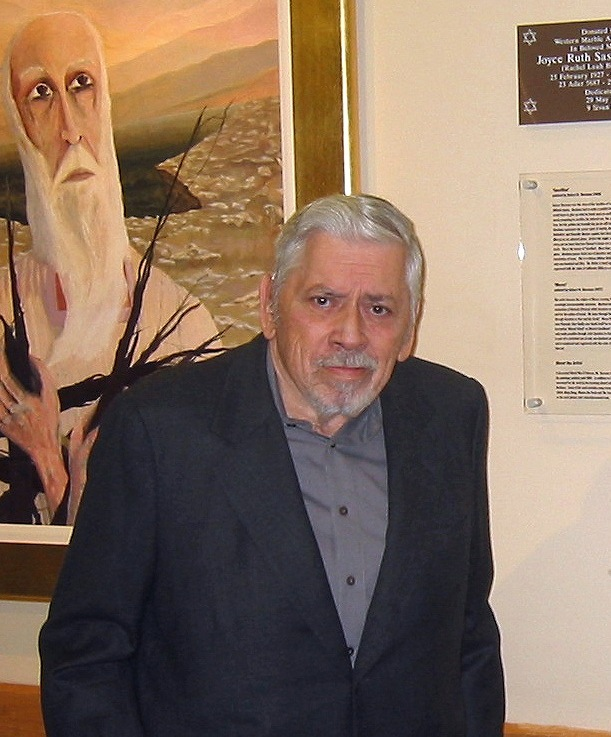
Sherman dedicating a print of his painting, Sacrifice (pictured) to the Western Marble Arch Synagogue in London in 2004. Officiating was Dr. Jonathan Sacks, Chief Rabbi of the British Empire and Commonwealth.

A lesser-known aspect of Sherman's life was his painting, which he had done since 1941 and kept private, except from his family and friends, until 2002. Sherman studied painting while attending Bard College, receiving a double degree in both Painting and English Literature. Sherman worked in various visual arts media, including clay and metal sculpture, but his focus was oil painting throughout the 1940s-1960s, when he switched to acrylics.

In April 2002, an exhibition of Sherman's paintings was held in London, England, at Thompsons' Gallery on Marylebone High Street. This marked the first public exhibition of his paintings since he started painting in 1941. Sherman exhibited his paintings in Florida and California. A series of Limited Edition Giclées of Sherman's art were published on canvas and paper.

Sherman's paintings that have appeared at the various exhibitions include On Route 9G (c. 1949), Self Portrait (1970), San Francisco (1970), Moses (1977), Carousel In The Country (1982), From the Dining Room (1982), Sacrifice (1983), Florid Window (1984), Geisha (1986), Fine Four Fendered Friend (2002), and Park Lane (2003). On March 4, 2007, Sherman and his son, Robbie, donated limited edition prints of Moses and Sacrifice to the Giffnock Synagogue in Glasgow, Scotland. Sherman worked in metal sculpture, wrote poetry and short stories from an early age.

In 1985, he narrated Prokofiev's “Peter and the Wolf” for the Naumburg Orchestral Concerts, in the Naumburg Bandshell, Central Park, in the summer series.

== Later life achievements, autobiography, honors, tributes ==
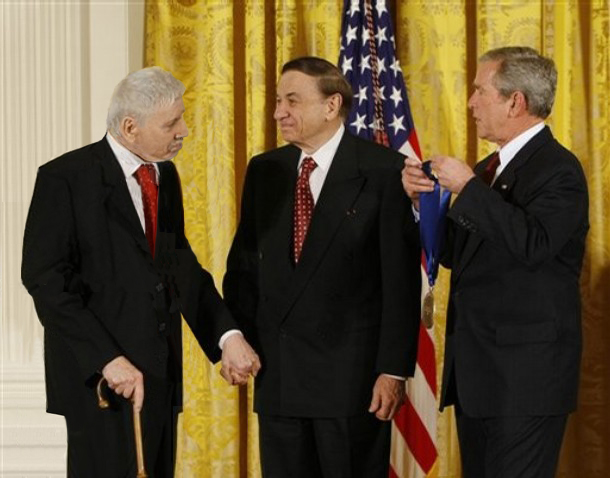
The Sherman Brothers receiving the National Medal of Arts at The White House on November 17, 2008 (left to right: Robert B. Sherman, Richard M. Sherman and U.S. President George W. Bush)

- In 2000, the Sherman Brothers wrote the award-winning score to The Tigger Movie which achieved number one status in both theatrical box office and video sales.
- The Sherman Brothers' classic motion picture, Chitty Chitty Bang Bang, was adapted into a London West End Musical in 2002 and premiered at the London Palladium on April 16, 2002, featuring many new songs and a reworked score by both Sherman Brothers. It was nominated for a 2003 Laurence Olivier Theatre Award for Best New Musical. The Sherman Brothers each received the "Musical Theatre Award" from the Variety Club of Great Britain that year as well for Chitty. Chitty finished a record-breaking, three-and-a-half-year run at the Palladium, becoming the longest-running show in the theatre's century-long history. 2004 saw the premiere of Mary Poppins on the stage. In 2005, Poppins was nominated for nine Olivier Awards. In 2005 Chitty went to Broadway and was nominated for 9 Tonys and also began its nationwide (UK) tour.
- On June 9, 2005, Sherman was inducted into the Songwriters Hall of Fame alongside Bill Withers, Steve Cropper, John Fogerty, Isaac Hayes, David Porter and his brother, Richard M. Sherman.
- On November 16, 2006, the Cameron Mackintosh/Disney production of Mary Poppins made its Broadway premiere at the New Amsterdam Theater featuring the Sherman Brothers' classic songs.
- During a London press junket promoting the 40th anniversary DVD rerelease of The Jungle Book, Robert and Richard Sherman were witnessed by press working on a new song for Inkas in the same Brown's Hotel room where The Jungle Book was originally penned by the British writer, Rudyard Kipling, over a hundred years earlier.
- In February 2008 Chitty Chitty Bang Bang began a second UK tour. In 2008 and 2009, Poppins premiered in numerous cities throughout the world including: Stockholm, Copenhagen, Budapest, Toronto, Shanghai, Sydney, Johannesburg, Amsterdam, Buenos Aires, São Paulo and Helsinki. Full UK and US tours of Poppins are also scheduled to commence in 2008 and 2009 respectively.
- On November 17, 2008, Robert and Richard Sherman were awarded the National Medal of Arts at the White House by President George W. Bush in the East Room. The National Medal of Arts is an award and title created by the Congress of the United States in 1984, for the purpose of honoring artists and patrons of the arts. It is the highest honor conferred to an individual artist on behalf of the people. Honorees are selected by the National Endowment for the Arts (NEA), and ceremoniously presented the award by the President of the United States.
- In May 2009, a documentary called The Boys: The Sherman Brothers' Story was released. In October 2009, Disney released The Sherman Brothers Songbook, a 59-track, two-CD compendium of their work for the studio spanning 42 years.
- On March 11, 2010, the Sherman Brothers were presented with a Window on Mainstreet Disneyland in Anaheim, California in honor of their contribution to Disney theme parks. On May 17, 2010, the "Career Achievement Award" at The Theatre Museum's 2010 Awards Gala.
- On May 21, 2011, the Sherman Brothers were each awarded honorary doctorate degrees in Fine Arts from their alma mater, Bard College. This was Robert's second honorary doctorate. His first was granted by Lincoln College on May 12, 1990.
- On May 4, 2023, a feature film development deal on the Sherman Brothers' animation musical, Inkas the Ramferinkas was announced.

=== Robert B. Sherman Scholarship ===
In 2005, Robert Sherman established an annual scholarship award in his name through the BMI Foundation. The awardee is chosen by BMI's Lehman Engel program with some consultation with Sherman. The first awardee was announced in November 2006. Awardees are chosen for their excellence in musical comedy songwriting with an emphasis on lyric writing. Following is a list of the annual winners since the award's inception:

- 2006 - Andrew Nellessen
- 2007 - Michael Mitnick
- 2008 (no award this year)
- 2009 - Jeffrey Simno
- 2010 - Andy Roninson

=== Moose: Chapters From My Life ===
- In 2013, Moose: Chapters From My Life, Sherman's autobiography, was edited by his son Robert J. Sherman and published by AuthorHouse Publishers. The book was acknowledged in the credits of the 2013 film Saving Mr. Banks which also features actors playing the Sherman Brothers. B. J. Novak portrayed Robert Sherman in the film.

=== Artistic tributes ===
- Marking the official UK book launch for Moose, Robert J. Sherman wrote and emceed a two-night cabaret called A Spoonful of Sherman which premiered at the St. James Theatre in London, England on January 6, 2014. The show was billed as "A Celebration of the Life, Times and Songs of Robert B. Sherman" and was received extremely well by the crowd and critics alike. The show took on a life of its own, subsequently enjoying a "sold out" return engagement later in the year at the same venue. The Original Cast Recording, double CD was produced by Nicholas Lloyd Webber and released by SimG Records in 2015.
- In 2017 A Spoonful of Sherman was revived, playing at the venue, "Live At Zédel" in London.
- On July 31, 2018, the Walt Disney Studios in Burbank, California renamed Soundstage A the Sherman Brothers Stage.
- In 2018 the first A Spoonful of Sherman UK/Ireland Tour began with previews on February 14, 2018, at the EM Forester Theatre in Tonbridge, Kent. The tour played in 28 cities in England, Scotland, Wales and the Republic of Ireland. Cast members for the tour included Sophie-Louise Dann, Mark Read, Glen Facey, Jenna Innes and Ben Stock.

== List of works ==
=== Major film scores ===
- The Parent Trap, 1961
- In Search of the Castaways, 1962
- Summer Magic, 1963
- The Sword in the Stone, 1963
- Big Red, 1963
- Mary Poppins, 1964
- That Darn Cat!, 1965
- The Happiest Millionaire, 1967
- The Jungle Book, 1967
- The One and Only, Genuine, Original Family Band, 1968
- Chitty Chitty Bang Bang, 1968
- The Aristocats, 1970
- Bedknobs and Broomsticks, 1971
- Snoopy Come Home, 1972
- Charlotte's Web, 1973
- Tom Sawyer, 1973
- Huckleberry Finn, 1974
- The Slipper and the Rose, 1976
- The Many Adventures of Winnie the Pooh, 1977
- The Magic of Lassie, 1978
- Magic Journeys, 1982
- Winnie the Pooh and a Day For Eeyore, 1983
- Little Nemo: Adventures in Slumberland, 1992
- The Mighty Kong, 1998
- Winnie the Pooh: Seasons of Giving, 1999
- The Tigger Movie, 2000
- The Jungle Book, 2016
- Christopher Robin, 2018

=== Motion picture screenplays ===
- A Symposium on Popular Songs (uncredited), 1962
- Mary Poppins, 1964 (treatment only, uncredited)
- The Adventures of Tom Sawyer, 1973
- The Adventures of Huckleberry Finn, 1974
- The Slipper and the Rose, 1976
- The Magic of Lassie, 1978
- Blue Echoes, 1982 (unproduced)
- Ferdinand the Bull, 1986 (TV screenplay)

=== Stage musicals ===
- Victory Canteen, 1971 (Ivar Theatre, L.A.)
- Over Here!, 1974 (Broadway, NY)
- Dawgs, 1983 (Variety Arts Center, L.A.)
- Busker Alley, 1995 (U.S. Tour)
- Chitty Chitty Bang Bang, 2002 (London)
- Mary Poppins, 2004 (London)
- On the Record 2004-05 (U.S. Tour)
- Chitty Chitty Bang Bang, 2005 (Broadway, NY)
- Chitty Chitty Bang Bang, 2005 (UK Tour)
- Busker Alley, 2006 (Broadway, NY – *one night only)
- Mary Poppins, 2006 (Broadway, NY)
- Chitty Chitty Bang Bang, 2007 (Singapore)
- Mary Poppins, 2008 (UK Tour)
- Chitty Chitty Bang Bang, 2008 (Second UK Tour)
- Mary Poppins, 2008 (Stockholm)
- Mary Poppins, 2009 (US Tour)
- Mary Poppins, 2009 (Copenhagen)
- Mary Poppins, 2009 (Budapest)
- Mary Poppins, 2009 (Shanghai)
- Mary Poppins, 2010 (Australia)
- Mary Poppins, 2009 (South Africa)
- Mary Poppins, 2009 (Amsterdam)
- Mary Poppins, 2009 (Helsinki)
- Summer Magic, 2012 (Morristown, Tennessee)
- The Jungle Book, 2013 (Chicago, Illinois)
- The Jungle Book, 2013 (Boston, Massachusetts)
- A Spoonful of Sherman, 2014 (London)
- Mary Poppins, 2015 (Vienna, Austria)
- Chitty Chitty Bang Bang, 2015–16 (UK Tour)
- Mary Poppins, 2015–16 (UK Tour)
- A Spoonful of Sherman, 2017 (London)
- A Spoonful of Sherman, 2018 (UK/Ireland Tour)
- A Spoonful of Sherman, 2019 (San Jose, CA)
- Mary Poppins, 2019 (London Revival)
- A Spoonful of Sherman, 2019 (Singapore)
- Bedknobs and Broomsticks, 2021 (UK Tour)

=== Theme park songs ===
- "There's a Great Big Beautiful Tomorrow" for the 1964 New York World's Fair attraction Carousel of Progress as part of General Electric's Progressland pavilion, later moved to Disneyland then to Walt Disney World
- "The Best Time of Your Life" for the Walt Disney World version of the Carousel of Progress, later replaced with the show's original theme in 1993.
- "Miracles from Molecules" for Adventure Thru Inner Space
- "One Little Spark" for Journey Into Imagination
- The Many Adventures of Winnie the Pooh (attraction)
- "It's a Small World (After All)" for the 1964 New York World's Fair attraction Pepsi Presents WALT DISNEY'S "it's a small world" - a Salute to UNICEF and the World's Children, then adapted to each Disney Park installation of "It's a Small World".
- "The Astuter Computer Revue" for the 1982 premiere of the CommuniCore Exhibit at EPCOT.
- "Magic Highways" for Rocket Rods
- "Makin' Memories" for Magic Journeys
- The Tiki, Tiki, Tiki Room for Walt Disney's Enchanted Tiki Room
- "We Meet the World with Love" and "Meet the World" for the same exhibit in Tokyo Disneyland

=== Autobiographic books ===
- Walt's Time: From Before to Beyond A joint autobiography by both Robert and Richard Sherman published in 1998.
- Moose: Chapters From My Life Robert B. Sherman's official memoirs posthumously released in 2013.

== Professional awards ==
=== Academy Awards ===
- 1965 Won Academy Award in the category of "Best Original Song" for "Chim Chim Cher-ee" from Mary Poppins
- 1965 Won Academy Award in the category of "Best Substantially Original Score" for Mary Poppins
- 1969 Nominated Academy Award in the category of "Best Original Song" for "Chitty Chitty Bang Bang" from Chitty Chitty Bang Bang
- 1972 Nominated Academy Award in the category of "Best Original Song" for "The Age of Not Believing" from Bedknobs & Broomsticks
- 1972 Nominated Academy Award in the category of "Best Scoring: Adaptation and Original Song Score" for Bedknobs & Broomsticks
- 1974 Nominated Academy Award in the category of "Best Scoring: Adaptation and Original Song Score" for Tom Sawyer
- 1978 Nominated Academy Award in the category of "Best Original Song" for "The Slipper and the Rose Waltz" from The Slipper and the Rose
- 1978 Nominated Academy Award in the category of "Best Scoring: Adaptation and Original Song Score" for The Slipper and the Rose
- 1979 Nominated Academy Award in the category of "Best Original Song" for "When You're Loved" from The Magic of Lassie

=== Annie Awards ===
- 2000 Nominated Annie in the category of "Outstanding Individual Achievement for Music in an Animated Feature Production" for the song "Round My Family Tree" from The Tigger Movie
- 2003 Winsor McCay Award for lifetime achievement and contribution to animation

=== BAFTA Awards ===
- 1977 Nominated Anthony Asquith Award for Film Music for The Slipper and the Rose

=== BMI ===
- 1977 Pioneer Award awarded in Los Angeles, California
- 1991 Lifetime Achievement Award awarded at the Beverly Wilshire Hotel in Los Angeles, California

=== Christopher Award ===
- 1964 Christopher Award for "Best Original Song Score" for Mary Poppins
- 1973 Christopher Award for "Best Original Song Score" for Tom Sawyer

=== Disney ===
- 1985 "Mousecar" awarded at the Hollywood Bowl in Hollywood, California in front of 20,000 people
- 1990 "Disney Legends" awarded at the Walt Disney Studios in Burbank, California
- 2010 Main Street, U.S.A. Window presented at Disneyland in Anaheim, California in honor of the Sherman Brothers' contribution to Disney theme parks.

=== Golden Globes ===
- 1965 Nominated Golden Globe in the category of "Best Original Score" for Mary Poppins
- 1969 Nominated Golden Globe in the category of "Best Original Score" for Chitty Chitty Bang Bang
- 1969 Nominated Golden Globe in the category of "Best Original Song" for "Chitty Chitty Bang Bang" from Chitty Chitty Bang Bang
- 1974 Nominated Golden Globe in the category of "Best Original Score" for Tom Sawyer
- 1977 Nominated Golden Globe in the category of "Best Original Score" for The Slipper and the Rose

=== Golden Videocassette Award ===
- 1984 Best Selling Video Cassette (of all time) for Mary Poppins

=== Grammy Awards ===
- 1965 Won Grammy in the category of "Best Original Score for a Motion Picture or Television Show" for Mary Poppins
- 1965 Won Grammy in the category of "Best Recording for Children" for Mary Poppins
- 1966 Nominated Grammy in the category of "Best Recording for Children" for Winnie the Pooh and the Honey Tree
- 1968 Nominated Grammy in the category of "Best Recording for Children" for The Jungle Book
- 1970 Nominated Grammy in the category of "Best Recording for Children" for Chitty Chitty Bang Bang
- 1971 Nominated Grammy in the category of "Best Recording for Children" for The Aristocats
- 1973 Nominated Grammy in the category of "Best Original Score for a Children's Show" for Snoopy Come Home
- 1974 Nominated Grammy in the category of "Best Original Score for a Musical Show" for Over Here!
- 1975 Won Grammy in the category of "Best Recording for Children" for Winnie the Pooh and Tigger Too

=== Laurel Awards ===
- 1965 Won Golden Laurel in the category of "Best Song" "Chim Chim Cher-ee" for Mary Poppins
- 1965 2nd Place Golden Laurel in the category of "Music Men"
- 1966 3rd place Golden Laurel in the category of "Best Song" "That Darn Cat!" for That Darn Cat!

=== Moscow Film Festival ===
- 1973 First Place Award in the category of "Best Music" for Tom Sawyer

=== National Medal of Arts ===
- 2008 National Medal of Arts awarded to Richard and Robert Sherman on November 17, 2008, at the White House by President George W. Bush. This is the highest honor the United States Government bestows on artists.

=== Olivier Awards ===
- 2002 Nominated "Best Musical" for Chitty Chitty Bang Bang

=== Songwriters Hall of Fame ===
- 2005 induction at the Marriott Hotel on Times Square in New York City

=== Theatre Museum Award ===
- 2010 Career Achievement Award presented on May 17, 2010, at the Players Club in New York City

=== Variety Club Awards ===
- 2003 Won "Best Musical" for Chitty Chitty Bang Bang

=== Walk of Fame ===
- 1976 A star on the Hollywood Walk of Fame awarded to "Richard & Robert Sherman" on November 17, 1976, located at 6914 Hollywood Boulevard

== See also ==
- Music World
- Armistice and Dedication Day
- Walt's Time: from before to beyond
- Moose: Chapters From My Life
