= Dress Circle (shop) =

British shop

Coordinates: 51.5134°N 0.1270°W

Dress Circle is a British specialist store that sells products related to the musical theatre, including cast albums, books, merchandise, and memorabilia. From 1978 until 2013, it operated a store near Covent Garden, London; since 2013 it has been an online-only retailer.

== History ==
The shop, which was named after the area of a traditional theatre called the dress circle, was founded in 1978 with the intention of providing an unrivalled selection of musical theatre and cabaret related merchandise. It claimed to be the longest running show business and musical theatre shop in the world and celebrated its 30th anniversary in 2008.

In 2011, Murray Allan owner of Dress Circle announced financial problems with the business and that closure would be imminent. London's Stage newspaper reported the story on the front page of its issue. Shortly after this announcement Dress Circle reported an 'immeasurable amount of support' from the performance community. Actor/producers Stuart Matthew Price and James Yeoburn were quick to arrange a series of in-store events and fund-raising galas under the name Dress Circle Benefit. Theatre performers, composers and celebrities from across the world came together in support of their mission and Dress Circle's small Covent Garden shop played host to the likes of: Barry Manilow, Ramin Karimloo, Alex Gaumond, Laurence Mark Whythe, Matt Rawle, John Owen Jones, Scott Alan, Oliver Tompsett, Lance Horne and Lucy May Barker in a month of weekend productions culminating in a sold-out concert in London's West End. The Dress Circle Benefit played at Her Majesty's Theatre on 7 August 2011 and united the best of the Westend and Broadway accompanied by a 50 piece orchestra. The concert, hosted by Aled Jones, featured original cast members from Les Misérables, Parade, The Witches of Eastwick and Miss Saigon surprised audiences with a guest, un-billed, appearance from Ellen Greene who reprised her role as Audrey in the film version of Little Shop of Horrors.

The Dress Circle Benefit Concert and producers Stuart Matthew Price and James Yeoburn received Whatsonstage and Broadway World nominations for 'Theatrical Event of the Year' in 2011.

Dress Circle announced on 31 July 2012 that it would close on 15 August 2012 after failing to negotiate a lease and citing a decline in sales due to "The downturn in the economy" and "CD’s becoming relics and downloads being more popular"

Dress Circle's retail shop finally closed down on 28 February 2013.

Dress Circle still continues online and supplies a range of Musical Theatre CDs, DVDs and other Theatrical Memorabilia including rare items, such as vinyl and brochures from long past shows at www.dresscircle.london

== Theatre evenings ==
Around 2010, the Dress Circle organised Theatre Evenings which typically includes:

- A top price seat at a specified West End Show or Cabaret Performance. (Generally with a discount to the face value of the ticket.)
- A private pre-show drinks party held in the basement of the shop.
- A discount voucher for any items bought at the shop prior to the performance.

Depending on the actual show the theatre evening also included:

- A voucher for a free interval drink at the evenings performance.
- A free souvenir programme or brochure of the selected performance.
- An opportunity at the end of the performance to meet the cast.

Past events included performances of Oliver!, Love Never Dies, The Drowsy Chaperone, and Avenue Q.

== Celebrity Signings ==
Many stars of the West End stage used the Dress Circle as a vehicle to promote their latest CD, DVD or autobiography by attending specially organised signings.

Elaine Paige, John Barrowman, Kerry Ellis, Jodie Prenger, Julie Andrews and Idina Menzel have all promoted their work in this way.

Original Cast Albums were frequently promoted in this way also; recent examples being The Sound of Music, The Lord of the Rings, Sister Act, Les Misérables (musical), Legally Blond and Avenue Q. Other signings included principal cast members of the new live cast recording of the Les Misérables 25th Anniversary.
