= Robert J. Sherman =

American songwriter (born 1968)

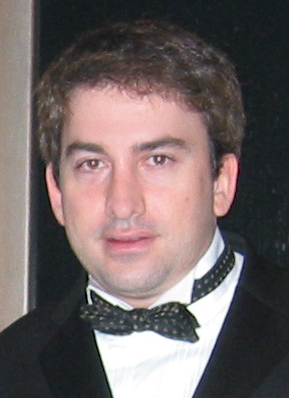
- Sherman in 2003

Background information
- Born: Robert Jason Sherman; July 16, 1968 (age 58); Los Angeles, California, U.S.
- Genre: Musical theater
- Occupation: Songwriter
- Years active: 1990–present
- Label: SimG Records
- Website: shermantheatrical.com

Robert Jason Sherman (born July 16, 1968), is an American songwriter based in London. He was born in Los Angeles to Joyce and Robert B. Sherman, the youngest of four siblings. Stemming from a long line of songwriters and composers, spanning more than four generations, at 16 Sherman became one of the youngest songwriters ever invited to join BMI and is an alum of the BMI Lehman Engel Musical Theatre Workshop. He is perhaps best known for his work on Love Birds: The Musical, which premiered at the 2015 Edinburgh Fringe Festival.

== Early life and education ==
Born and raised in Beverly Hills, California, Sherman attended Hawthorne Elementary School. In grade six, Sherman wrote the Hawthorne School song. In eighth grade he was voted student body president. At Beverly Hills High School Sherman joined the Madrigal Singers and the marching band. In his senior year, Sherman became the band's drum major and composed the graduation song "Let Time Stand Still". During his high school years Sherman won two "Awards of Distinction" at the Los Angeles Student Film Festival for two of his short film musicals respectively: Dog of Darkness (1983) and The Magic Tuba (1984). He graduated in 1986. Sherman did his undergraduate studies at the University of Southern California School of Cinema-Television with an emphasis in screenwriting. At USC, Sherman was initiated into the Tau Gamma chapter of Tau Epsilon Phi (ΤΕΦ) fraternity. He received a BFA degree in Filmic Writing in 1990. In 2012 Sherman received an MA (with Merit) in Jewish Studies from King's College London.

== Career ==
At 18 Sherman co-wrote songs for the musical, A Christmas Held Captive (Beverly Hills Playhouse). Since then Sherman has written songs and/or script for various film, stage and TV productions including Amazon Jack (Miramax), The Magic 7 (Pulse Entertainment) and The Penguin Pirate. In the late 1980s and early 1990s Sherman was lead singer/songwriter and guitarist for two rock bands, Numbers and SHACK. Current projects include Inkas the Ramferinkas (an animation musical film) and Bumblescratch which was workshopped at The Network Theatre in London in 2013. In 2014 Sherman wrote, narrated and produced A Spoonful of Sherman, a cabaret celebrating 90 years of Sherman songwriting. The show received four stars from The Times (London). The Original London Cast Recording was released in July 2015 by SimG Records. In 2015 Sherman's song, "Disneyana!" was named the "official theme song" of the Disneyana Fan Club. It was debuted during 60th Anniversary Celebrations of the Disneyland theme park during the annual Disneyana Convention held in Anaheim at which time Sherman also received the 2015 Disneyana President's Award for his service to the organization. Sherman's musical, Love Birds (for which he wrote both book and songs) premiered at the Edinburgh Fringe Festival in August 2015 and was widely praised by the press, receiving numerous five star and four star reviews. The Original Edinburgh Cast Recording of Love Birds was produced by Sherman and released in August 2015 by SimG Records and was also widely praised. In 2016 Sherman contributed material to Ms: A Song Cycle which was subtitled as having been "inspired by women living with multiple sclerosis". The project was conceived by lyricist Rory Sherman (unrelated). The song they collaborated on, entitled: "Mondays", became the final piece on the album and was performed by Rosemary Ashe. A one night, gala charity concert of Bumblescratch commemorating the 350th anniversary of the Great Fire of London premiered at the Adelphi Theatre in London on September 4, 2016. At the conclusion of the performance, Sherman was named a Variety Club Celebrity Ambassador alongside director/choreographer Stewart Nicholls and Bumblescratch stars: Darren Day, Jessica Martin and Michael Xavier. SimG Records released a CD of musical highlights from the London concert in December 2016. The CD was widely praised. A Spoonful of Sherman returned to London for two weeks in August 2017 with Sherman narrating once again. The show featured West End stars, Helena Blackman and Daniel Boys. On December 20, 2017, the launch of the A Spoonful of Sherman UK/Ireland tour was announced with previews beginning on February 14, 2018, at the EM Forester Theatre in Tonbridge, Kent. Cast members for the tour included Sophie-Louise Dann, Mark Read, Glen Facey, Jenna Innes and Ben Stock. The tour went to over 25 cities and towns across the UK and Ireland and the reviews were very favorable. In 2019, A Spoonful of Sherman was licensed for productions in Singapore and San Jose, California. In January 2022 The Robbie Sherman Songbook was published by Hal Leonard music publishers. The Songbook included 16 of Sherman's songs from five musicals. In March 2022 a "Backing Tracks and Vocal Guides" audio album was also released to accompany the first album.

=== About being a songwriter ===
In an interview Sherman said, "My earliest memory is that I wanted to be a songwriter. It's a strange thing to call an 'earliest memory', I suppose. But there it is. I was, perhaps two or three years old. From where I stood, my father and uncle wrote the type of music that children loved. So that's what I wanted to do too."

== Sherman Theatrical Entertainment ==
In 2021, alongside finance professionals Bret Goldin and Andrew Kaplan, Sherman created Sherman Theatrical Entertainment, Ltd. The new company was created to bring theatrical productions of Sherman's and the Sherman Family's to stage, screen, and streaming. The company is also focused on music publishing and licensing of select songs and projects from his own and his family's library. On May 4, 2023 it was announced that company was in a feature film development deal on the Sherman Brothers' animation musical, Inkas the Ramferinkas.

== Literary work ==
In 2013 Sherman oversaw and completed the publication of Robert B. Sherman's Moose: Chapters From My Life, serving as the book's editor. In 2010, with his father's permission, Sherman provided an advance copy of the book to the production team of the Walt Disney motion picture Saving Mr. Banks starring Tom Hanks and Emma Thompson. The book became a primary piece of source material for the screenwriters' script. In the summer of 2012, now serving as the Trustee of the Robert B. Sherman Estate, Sherman consulted directly with the producer, director and one of the writers concerning the film. The first edition of Moose was released in 2013, a year following the author's death, and timed to coincide with the release of Saving Mr. Banks. The book was published by AuthorHouse, an affiliate of Penguin Random House. In 2016 Sherman provided the narration for the unabridged audible audiobook version. The audiobook was published by Orchard Hill Press.

== Publishing, archives and family legacy ==
Sherman became the vice president of Music World Corporation in 1993. Upon the death of his father in 2012, Sherman became the CEO/president of Music World. In 2013 Sherman founded its affiliate Music World LLC in the United States and MusicWorld UK, Ltd. specifically for his own work. Sherman is a trustee of the Robert B. Sherman Family Estate and Archives, which includes one-half of the Sherman Brothers and Al Sherman estates. Sherman is a frequent lecturer on the subjects of song and story writing. Since 2014 Sherman has led an annual Walking With Giants trolley and walking tour through Beverly Hills, where the Sherman family has lived (in whole or in part) since 1938. The tour highlights significant places and moments in the lives of the Sherman Brothers and their father, songwriter Al Sherman. Sherman resides in London, England.
