= Robyn North =

- Born: 16 September 1983 (age 42)

Robyn North (born 16 September 1983) is an English soprano and musical theatre actress. She trained at the Sandy Gray School of Dancing, and the London Studio Centre on full scholarship. Robyn is married to Neil Franklin.

== Career ==
North received a 2008 Whatsonstage.com Theatregoers Choice Award nomination for Best Takeover in a Role, for her portrayal of Christine Daaé in The Phantom of the Opera. Her long association with the show began for her at the age of 19, when she understudied and played the role on numerous occasions. She later took over as Alternate Christine, and in 2007 she finally returned to the show to take over the role in her own right.

Her other theatre credits include Miss Dorothy in Thoroughly Modern Millie in the first national tour in which she also understudied the title role of Millie, opposite Lesley Joseph and the national tour of Scrooge in the lead role of Isabel/Helen opposite Shane Richie for Bill Kenwright Ltd. More recently she appeared and the original cast of Andrew Lloyd Webber's revival of Evita directed by Michael Grandage at the Adelphi Theatre, appearing on the original cast recording.

In 2010–2011, she toured in the play Master Class with Stephanie Beacham for Theatre Royal Bath Productions directed by Jonathan Church, in which she played Sophie de Palma. In 2012, she starred as Nellie Collins in Floyd Collins by Adam Guettel at the Southwark Playhouse.

North recorded her debut album Make Believe at Abbey Road Studios which was released on Jay Records in October 2008. Her screen credits include Kate in Hustle for BBC and the Les Misérables film.

== Stage credits ==
=== Musicals ===
- The Phantom of the Opera (Alternate Christine), Her Majesty's Theatre, West End
- Floyd Collins (Nellie Collins), Southwark Playhouse
- Thoroughly Modern Millie (Miss Dorothy & u/s Millie), No. 1 National Tour
- Scrooge the Musical (Isabel – lead), National Tour/Bill Kenwright Ltd
- Evita (Ensemble), 2006 Original Cast, Adelphi Theatre
- The Phantom of the Opera (Christine Daaé), Her Majesty's Theatre, West End.

2008 Whatsonstage.com Theatregoers Choice Nomination – Best Takeover in a Role

- Rebels and Retail (Stacey), Trafalgar Studios (Perfect Pitch season)
- Master Class (Sophie de Palma), Theatre Royal Bath/Chichester/National Tour

=== Screen ===
- Hustle (Kate), BBC
- Les Misérables, Working Title/Cameron Mackintosh

=== Concerts ===
- Broadway to West End (Soloist), Theatre Royal, Drury Lane
- The Princes Charity Gala (Soloist), Peacock Theatre
- Theatre, A History (Soloist), Stanwell House
- A-Z of Musical Theatre (Soloist), Theatre Royal, Wexford
- Musical Stages 10th Birthday (Soloist)
- Whatsonstage Awards 2007/8 (Soloist), Café de Paris/Lyric Theatre
- Gotta Sing Gotta Dance (Soloist), UK Tour
- The Music of Andrew Lloyd Webber (Soloist), West-End International
- The Best of the West-End (Soloist), West-End International

=== Discography ===
Year	Show	Role
2006	Evita (Original Cast Recording)	Ensemble
?	Songs from The Sound of Music (JAY Records, Abbey Road Studios)	Maria
?	Friday Night is Music Night (BBC Radio 2)	Soloist
2008	Make Believe (JAY Records)	Debut Album
