= Stewart Nicholls =

British choreographer and theatre director (born 20th century

Stewart Nicholls (born 20th century) is a British stage director and choreographer.

== Career ==
His credits include productions of: A Spoonful of Sherman (2018 UK/Ireland tour, St James' Theatre and Live at Zédel), Bumblescratch (Adelphi Theatre), Bar Mitzvah Boy (Above the Gatehouse), Love Birds (The Pleasance, Edinburgh), Free as Air (Finborough Theatre), Business as Usual (a new play commissioned by Cheltenham Everyman Theatre and devised by Nicholls), Jewish Legends, Salad Days and The Biograph Girl (London College of Music), Lunch with Marlene (national tour), Beatlemania (Gothenburg Opera House), Gay's the Word (Jermyn Street Theatre and Finborough Theatre), Over My Shoulder (national tour and Wyndhams Theatre), South Pacific (Birmingham Symphony Hall/BBC Radio 2), and Carousel (St. David’s Hall, Cardiff/BBC Radio 3) and Tim Rice's revival of Blondel (Pleasance Theatre).

Nicholls's choreography credits include: Iolanthe and The Mikado (national tour) and Cowardy Custard (national tour).

He has also directed productions in drama schools and staged numerous pantomimes.

Nicholls co-produced a CD for The Amazons; it was nominated for a Grammy Award. Nicholls has contributed to the Oxford Handbook of the British Musical. In 2016, Nicholls was named a Variety Club Celebrity Ambassador.
