= SimG Records =

- Parent company: SimG Productions
- Founded: 2009
- Founder: Simon Greiff
- Genre: New musical theatre
- Country of origin: United Kingdom
- Official website: simgproductions.com

SimG Records is an independent record label dedicated to promoting new musical theatre and new writers to British audiences. Founded by London-based director/producer Simon Greiff in 2009, the label focuses on bringing fresh talent to the forefront. Its affiliate company, SimG Productions, showcases new work through stage performances, concerts, cabarets, plays, and CD releases. In 2014, SimG Records garnered seven Broadway World Album Award nominations for its releases.

== Critical Praise for SimG Founder, Simon Greiff ==
Mark Shenton of The Stage wrote, "Simon Greiff does more individually to support new writers than just about anyone in British Theatre."

== Albums ==
Original Cast Recording

- A Spoonful of Sherman (A.Sherman/R.M. & R.B. Sherman/R.J.Sherman)
- The A-Z of Mrs. P. (Gwyneth Herbert / Diane Samuels)
- The Bakewell Bake Off (The Baking Committee)
- Before After (Price/Knapman)
- Beyond The Gate: a musical revue' (various)
- Bumblescratch (R.J.Sherman)
- Girl In A Crisis (Andrew Fisher)
- Imaginary (musical)|Imaginary (Price/Knapman)
- Love Birds (R.J.Sherman)
- Molly Wobbly’s Tit Factory (Paul Boyd)
- Sleeping Arrangements (Chris Burgess)
- Soho Cinders - Live Concert Recording (Stiles/Drewe)
- A Song Cycle For Soho (various)
- Stand Tall: A Rock Musical (L. Wyatt-Buchan, A. & S. Chalmers)
- Ushers: The Front of House Musical (Yiannis Koutsakos / James Oban)

Studio Cast Recording

- Goldilocks and the Three Bears (Stiles/Drewe)
- My Land's Shore (Christopher Orton/Robert Gould)
- Paradise Lost (Lee Ormsby/Jonathan Wakeham)
- The Three Little Pigs (Stiles/Drewe)

Concept Recording

- Comrade Rockstar (Julian Woolford/ Richard John)
- The Confession Room (Dan Looney/ Patrick Wilde)
- Ms. A Song Cycle (Rory Sherman/various)
- Van Winkle: a folk musical (Caroline Wigmore)

Composer/Lyricist Recording

- Acoustic Overtures: The Songs of Dougal Irvine (Dougal Irvine)
- Collaborations: The Songs Of Elliot Davis (Elliot Davis)
- Love, Lies and Lyrics: The Words of Lesley Ross (Lesley Ross)
- Somewhere In My Mind: The Songs of Joe Sterling (Joe Sterling)

West End Vocalists

- Annalene Beechey - Close Your Eyes
- Ben Stock - And There Was Music
- Caroline Sheen - Raise The Curtain
- Richard Woodford - Because Of You
- Simon Bailey - Looking Up
- Stephen de Martin - One Voice
- Stuart Matthew Price - All Things In Time
