= A Spoonful of Sherman =

- St. James Theatre poster by Rebecca Pitt (Second Run)
- Music: Al Sherman; Richard M. Sherman; Robert B. Sherman; Robert J. Sherman
- Lyrics: Al Sherman; Richard M. Sherman; Robert B. Sherman; Robert J. Sherman
- Book: Robert J. Sherman
- Productions: 2014 London; 2017 London; 2018 UK/Ireland Tour; 2019 San Jose; 2019 Singapore

A Spoonful of Sherman is a musical revue written and emceed by Robert J. Sherman which premiered on January 6, 2014 at the St. James Theatre in London.

The cast consisted of four rising West End theatre stars including Charlotte Wakefield, Emma Williams, Stuart Matthew Price and Greg Castiglioni. Musical Direction was provided by Colin Billing and the show was directed by Stewart Nicholls. Lighting was designed by the show's Stage Manager Andrew Holton. In the 2017 version of the show, focus of the show's narrative shifted to both Sherman Brothers' lives as well as to the life of their father, Al Sherman.

== Premise ==
The show covers ninety years of Sherman songwriting (including material written by the Sherman Brothers' father, Al Sherman (who began writing music in the early 1920s). Songs written by the younger Robert Sherman were also included in the show as well) but the focus of the evening was the music and lyrics of Robert B. Sherman and the Sherman Brothers.

== Productions ==
=== 2014 Productions ===
The show was originally produced by MusicWorld (UK) in association with the St. James Theatre, James Albrecht, Creative Director. Joanne Benjamin and Clive Chenery of The Entertainment Business provided General Management.

The show was successful enough to merit further shows being scheduled for April 2014.

=== 2017 Production ===
A Spoonful of Sherman returned to London from August 7–20, 2017 at "Live at Zédel". Helena Blackman and Daniel Boys starred alongside pianist/singer Christopher Hamilton. Narrating the show once again was Robert J. Sherman. While the book for the two 2014 productions largely remained the same, in the 2017 version, Sherman modified his script, removing emphasis on his father, Robert B. Sherman's life and making the story more about both Sherman Brothers (Robert and Richard) and their Tin Pan Alley era songwriter father, Al Sherman. New musical arrangements were provided by Rowland Lee. Robert J. Sherman explained that changes had to do with the evolution of the show's purpose for being. In 2014 the show was designed merely to serve as a "happy memorial" to his recently deceased songwriter father, Robert B. Sherman, but as the show grew, it began to take on a life of its own, the purpose, and therefore, the focus of the show needed to change as well.

=== 2018 UK/Ireland Tour ===
On December 20, 2017 the show's producers announced the launch of the first A Spoonful of Sherman UK/Ireland tour. The tour premiered on February 14, 2018 at the EM Forester Theatre in Tonbridge, Kent with its press night held on March 27 in Greenwich. The tour production marked a departure from previous incarnations of the show, evolving from cabaret to fully realized stage musical. Cast members for the tour include Sophie-Louise Dann, Mark Read, Glen Facey, Jenna Innes and Ben Stock. Stewart Nicholls directed and choreographed with a new book devised by Robert Sherman. Stage and costume design was by Gabriella Slade, Lighting Design was by Chris Withers and new musical arrangements and musical supervision was provided by Rowland Lee. The tour played in 25 different cities spanning the United Kingdom and Ireland.

=== 2019 Licensed Productions ===
In late 2018 the previous year's UK/Ireland tour version was made available for professional license. In April 2019 A Spoonful of Sherman made its U.S. premiere in San Jose, California. The San Jose run played for five weeks at the 3Below Stages featuring veteran Bay Area performers, Shannon Guggenheim, Stephen Guggenheim, Susan Gundunas, F. James Raasch, Teresa Swain and pianist Barry Koron. In July 2019 it was announced that a licensed production of A Spoonful of Sherman would be presented by Sing'Theatre at School of the Arts in Singapore starring Hossan Leong, Mina Ellen Kaye, George Chan, Aaron Khaled and Vanessa Kee.
