= 1930 in music =

This is a list of notable events in music that took place in the year 1930.

== Specific locations ==
- 1930 in British music
- 1930 in Norwegian music

== Specific genres ==
- 1930 in country music
- 1930 in jazz

== Events ==
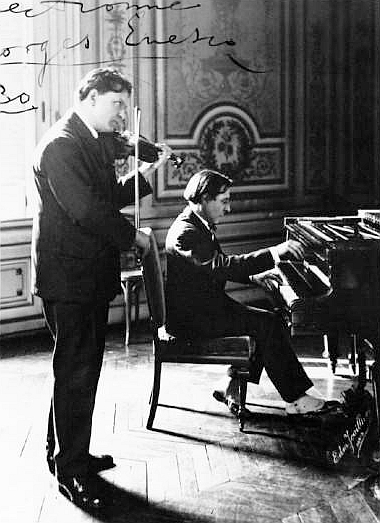
George Enescu and Alfred Cortot in 1930

- February 7 – The 13th Sound Ensemble of Havana, conducted by Ángel Reyes, makes the first recording of Julián Carrillo's microtonal Preludio a Colón for Columbia Records in New York City.
- February 16 – Nicolas Slonimsky conducts the first performance of Charles Ives's Three Places in New England.
- February 17 – The Technicolor musical film, The Vagabond King, is released. Dennis King recreates his original London and Broadway stage role as Villon in this film, and records two songs from the film for Victor Records.
- April 1 – Brunswick-Balke-Collender sells Brunswick Records to Warner Brothers, who are hopeful that the move will enable them to make bigger profits from their musicals by enabling them to profit from the sale of records. They also acquire four music publishers to profit from sales in sheet music.
- May 10
  - Metropolitan Opera baritone Lawrence Tibbett's first film The Rogue Song, a lavish Technicolor musical, is released to rave reviews. Lawrence Tibbett records the songs he sang in the film for Victor Records.
  - The film version of the stage hit Hold Everything is released. Winnie Lightner and Joe E. Brown star in this Technicolor musical which opens to rave reviews. Of the film's song, "When the Little Red Roses Get the Blues for You", becomes a hit. Al Jolson records this song from the picture for Brunswick Records.
- May 25 – The all Technicolor musical film, Song of the Flame, based on the 1925 Broadway musical of the same name, is released to rave reviews. The film stars Noah Beery and Bernice Claire and is nominated for an Oscar for "Best Sound Recording". Noah Beery records his song from the picture for Brunswick Records.
- August 24 – Festival Puccini is launched at Torre del Lago.
- October 29 – Bing Crosby makes his first recording with the Gus Arnheim orchestra as a solo vocalist. His new type of singing voice, a low baritone, becomes a sensation and will gradually displace (by around 1935) the standard tenor voice that had characterized the vocals of popular music in the 1920s.
- December 2 - John Serry (John Serrapica) makes his debut on the Italian radio station WCDA in New York City at the age of 15.
- December 10 – First performance of Bertolt Brecht's play The Decision, with music by Hanns Eisler.
- December 13 – Ernest Ansermet conducts the world premiere of Stravinsky's Symphony of Psalms, in Brussels.
- December 31 – Record sales dropped 50% from 1929
- The BBC Symphony Orchestra is formed in London.
- The song "Body and Soul" is written by Johnny Green with lyrics by Edward Heyman, Robert Sour and Frank Eyton in New York City for the British actress Gertrude Lawrence who first performs in London (where it is also first published). Libby Holman introduces it to the United States in the Broadway revue Three's a Crowd and Louis Armstrong is the first jazz musician to record it. There are at least 11 recordings by the end of the year and it becomes the all-time most recorded jazz standard.
- Frankie Laine sings to an audience of 5,000 at The Merry Garden Ballroom.
- John Serry Sr. begins a series of extended appearances with the Waldorf-Astoria Orchestra under the conductor Misha Borr at the Waldorf-Astoria hotel in New York City
- Bukka White makes his first recording.

== Published popular songs ==
- "Across the Breakfast Table (Looking at You)" w.m. Irving Berlin, Featured in the Warner Bros. musical Mammy
- "After a Million Dreams" w. Edgar Leslie m. Walter Donaldson, Featured in the William Fox musical film Cameo Kirby
- "All I Want is Just One Girl" w. Leo Robin m. Richard A. Whiting, Featured in the Paramount musical film Paramount on Parade
- "Alone in the Rain" w.m. Dan Dougherty and Edmund Goulding, Featured in the Pathe musical film The Grand Parade
- "Alone with My Dreams" w. Gus Kahn m. Harry Archer
- "Always in All Ways" w. Leo Robin m. Richard A. Whiting & W. Franke Harling. Introduced by Jeanette MacDonald in the Paramount musical film Monte Carlo.
- "Any Time's the Time to Fall in Love" w.m. Elsie Janis and Jack King, Featured in the Paramount musical film Paramount on Parade
- "A Bench in the Park" w. Jack Yellen m. Milton Ager, Featured in the Universal musical film King of Jazz
- "Betty Co-Ed" w.m. J. Paul Fogarty & Rudy Vallee
- "Beware of Love" m.w. William Kernell, Featured in the William Fox musical film Women Everywhere
- "Beyond the Blue Horizon" w. Leo Robin m. Richard A. Whiting & W. Franke Harling. Introduced by Jeanette MacDonald in the Paramount musical film Monte Carlo.
- "Blue Again" w. Dorothy Fields m. Jimmy McHugh. Introduced by Evelyn Hoey in The Vanderbilt Revue.
- "Blue is the Night" w.m. Fred Fisher, from the MGM musical film Their Own Desire
- "Body and Soul" w. Robert Sour, Edward Heyman & Frank Eyton m. Johnny Green
- "Bye Bye Blues" w.m. Bert Lown, Chauncey Gray, Fred Hamm & Dave Bennett
- "Can This Be Love?" w. Paul James m. Kay Swift. Introduced by Alice Boulden in the musical Fine and Dandy (musical)|Fine and Dandy.
- "Can't We Talk It Over?" w. Ned Washington m. Victor Young
- "Caribbean Love Song" w.m. Eugene Berton, Featured in the United Artists film Hell Harbor
- "Cheerful Little Earful" w. Ira Gershwin & Billy Rose m. Harry Warren
- "Cooking Breakfast for the One I Love" w. Billy Rose m. Henry Tobias
- "A Cottage for Sale" w. Larry Conley m. Willard Robison
- "Dancing on the Ceiling" w. Lorenz Hart m. Richard Rodgers
- "Dancing with Tears in My Eyes" w. Al Dubin m. Joe Burke, Featured in the Warner Bros. musical Dancing Sweeties
- "Dangerous Nan McGrew" w. Dan Hartman m. Al Goodhart
- "Don't Tell Him What Happened to Me" w. B. G. De Sylva & Lew Brown m. Ray Henderson
- "Down the River of Golden Dreams" w. John Klenner m. Nathaniel Shilkret
- "Embraceable You" w. Ira Gershwin m. George Gershwin
- "Exactly Like You" w. Dorothy Fields m. Jimmy McHugh
- "Falling in Love Again" w. (Eng) Sammy Lerner m. Frederick Hollander
- "Fine and Dandy" w. Paul James (pseudonym for James Warburg) m. Kay Swift
- "For You" w. Al Dubin m. Joe Burke
- "Gee, But I'd Like to Make You Happy" w.m. Larry Shay, Ward & Montgomery
- "Georgia on My Mind" w. Stuart Gorrell m. Hoagy Carmichael
- "Get Happy" w. Ted Koehler m. Harold Arlen
- "Goofus" w. Gus Kahn m. Wayne King & William Harold
- "Happy Feet" w. Jack Yellen m. Milton Ager
- "I Am Only Human After All" w. Ira Gershwin & E. Y. Harburg m. Vernon Duke
- "I Bring a Love Song" w. Oscar Hammerstein II m. Sigmund Romberg from the musical film Viennese Nights
- "I Got Rhythm" w. Ira Gershwin m. George Gershwin from the musical Girl Crazy
- "I Love You So Much" w. Bert Kalmar m. Harry Ruby
- "If Your Kisses Can't Hold the Man You Love" w. Jack Yellen m. Vivian Ellis
- "I'm Confessin' That I Love You" w. Al J. Neiburg m. Doc Daugherty & Ellis Reynolds
- "I'm Glad I Waited" w.m. Vincent Youmans
- "I'm In the Market for You" w. Joseph McCarthy m. James F. Hanley
- "Into My Heart" w. Roy Turk m. Fred Ahlert. Introduced by Ramón Novarro in the film In Gay Madrid
- "It Happened In Monterey" w. Billy Rose m. Mabel Wayne
- "It Must Be True" w.m. Gus Arnheim, Harry Barris & Gordon Clifford
- "J'ai deux amours" w. Georges Koger & H. Varna m. Vincent Scotto
- "Just a Gigolo" w. (Eng) Irving Caesar (Ger) Julius Brammer m. Leonello Casucci
- "The Kiss Waltz" w. Al Dubin m. Joe Burke
- "Lady, Play Your Mandolin" w. Irving Caesar m. Oscar Levant
- "The Little Things in Life" w.m. Irving Berlin
- "Little White Lies" w.m. Walter Donaldson
- "Livin' in the Sunlight, Lovin' in the Moonlight" w. Al Lewis m. Al Sherman. Introduced by Maurice Chevalier in the film The Big Pond
- "Love for Sale" w.m. Cole Porter
- "Lucky Seven" w. Howard Dietz m. Arthur Schwartz
- "Memories of You" w. Andy Razaf m. Eubie Blake
- "My Future Just Passed" w. George Marion Jr m. Richard A. Whiting
- "Nina Rosa" w. Irving Caesar m. Sigmund Romberg
- "Nine Little Miles From Ten-Ten-Tennessee" w.m. Al Sherman & Al Lewis & Con Conrad
- "Ninety-Nine Out of a Hundred (Wanna Be Loved)" w.m. Al Sherman & Al Lewis
- "On the Sunny Side of the Street" w. Dorothy Fields m. Jimmy McHugh
- "Please Don't Talk About Me When I'm Gone" w. Sidney Clare m. Sam H. Stept
- "Sam and Delilah" w. Ira Gershwin m. George Gershwin from the musical Girl Crazy
- "Send for Me" w. Lorenz Hart m. Richard Rodgers
- "Sing, You Sinners" w.m. W. Franke Harling & Sam Coslow. Introduced by Lillian Roth in the film Honey
- "Someday I'll Find You" w.m. Noël Coward
- "Something to Remember You By" w. Howard Dietz m. Arthur Schwartz
- "The Song of the Dawn" w. Jack Yellen m. Milton Ager from the film King of Jazz
- "Sugar Bush" w. trad. Afrikaans m. Fred Michel
- "Sweepin' the Clouds Away" w.m. Sam Coslow
- "Sweet Jennie Lee" w.m. Walter Donaldson
- "Telling it to the Daisies" w. Joe Young m. Harry Warren
- "Ten Cents a Dance" w. Lorenz Hart m. Richard Rodgers
- "Them There Eyes" w.m. Maceo Pinkard, William Tracey & Doris Tauber
- "They All Fall in Love" w.m. Cole Porter
- "Three Little Words" w. Bert Kalmar m. Harry Ruby
- "Time on My Hands" w. Harold Adamson & Mack Gordon m. Vincent Youmans
- "Two Loves Have I" w. (Eng) J. P. Murray & Barry Trivers m. Vincent Scotto
- "Walking My Baby Back Home" w.m. Roy Turk & Fred Ahlert
- "The Waltz You Saved for Me" w. Gus Kahn m. Wayne King & Emil Flindt
- "When I'm Looking At You" w. Clifford Grey m. Herbert Stothart. Introduced by Lawrence Tibbett in the film The Rogue Song
- "When Your Hair Has Turned To Silver" w. Charles Tobias m. Peter De Rose
- "The White Dove" w. Clifford Grey m. Franz Lehár
- "Why Am I So Romantic?" w. Bert Kalmar m. Harry Ruby
- "Would You Like to Take a Walk?" w. Mort Dixon & Billy Rose m. Harry Warren
- "You Brought a New Kind of Love to Me" w.m. Sammy Fain, Irving Kahal and Pierre Norman. Introduced by Maurice Chevalier in the film The Big Pond.
- "You Will Remember Vienna" w. Oscar Hammerstein II m. Sigmund Romberg
- "You're Driving Me Crazy" w.m. Walter Donaldson

== Top Popular Recordings 1930 ==
After $75 million in sales during 1929, the stock market crash in October nearly destroyed the industry, after forty years of consistent operation. Sales fell to $18 million in 1930 and to under $6 million in 1931.

The top popular records of 1930 listed below were compiled from Joel Whitburn's Pop Memories 1890–1954, record sales reported on the "Discography of American Historical Recordings" website, and other sources as specified. Numerical rankings are approximate, there were no Billboard charts in 1930, the numbers are only used for a frame of reference.

Rank	Artist	Title	Label	Recorded	Released	Chart Positions
1	Rudy Vallee and His Connecticut Yankees	"Stein Song (University of Maine)"	Victor 22321	February 10, 1930	March 5, 1930	US Billboard 1930 #1, US #1 for 10 weeks, 21 total weeks
2	Don Azpiazu and His Havana Casino Orchestra	"The Peanut Vendor"	Victor 22483	May 13, 1930	September 1930	US Billboard 1930 #2, US #1 for 7 weeks, 28 total weeks, National Recording Registry 2005
3	Nat Shilkret and the Victor Orchestra (voc Lewis James)	"Dancing With Tears In My Eyes"	Victor 22425	May 12, 1930	June 10, 1930	US Billboard 1930 #3, US #1 for 7 weeks, 11 total weeks
4	Paul Whiteman and His Orchestra (Vocal Jack Fulton)	"Body and Soul"	Columbia 2297D	September 10, 1930	October 1930	US Billboard 1930 #4, US #1 for 6 weeks, 15 total weeks
5	Fred Waring's Pennsylvanians	"Little White Lies"	Victor 22492	July 25, 1930	October 1930	US Billboard 1930 #5, US #1 for 6 weeks, 12 total weeks, 75,001 sales
6	Rudy Vallee and His Connecticut Yankees	"If I Had a Girl Like You"	Victor 22419	April 30, 1930	May 25, 1930	US Billboard 1930 #6, US #3 for 10 total weeks, 73,710 sales
7	Guy Lombardo and His Royal Canadians	"You're Driving Me Crazy!"	Columbia 2335D	November 11, 1930	November 1930	US Billboard 1930 #7, US #1 for 4 weeks, 12 total weeks
8	Duke Ellington and His Orchestra v_The Rhythm Boys	"Three Little Words"	Victor 22488	August 26, 1930	September 5, 1930	US Billboard 1930 #8, US #1 for 3 weeks, 13 total weeks
9	Hilo Hawaiian Orchestra (vocals Carson Robison and Frank Luther)	"When It's Springtime in the Rockies"	Victor 22339	February 24, 1930	April 1930	US Billboard 1930 #9, US #1 for 2 weeks, 19 total weeks
10	Isham Jones Orchestra	"Star Dust"	Brunswick 4856	May 15, 1930	July 1930	US Billboard 1930 #10, US #1 for 1 week, 20 total weeks
11	Ben Selvin and His Orchestra	"When It's Springtime in the Rockies"	Columbia 2206D	May 15, 1930	June 1930	US Billboard 1930 #12, US #1 for 3 weeks, 11 total weeks
12	McKinney's Cotton Pickers	"If I Could Be with You One Hour To-night"	Victor 38115	January 31, 1930	July 1930	US Billboard 1930 #10, US #1 for 2 weeks, 12 total weeks
13	Roy Ingraham and His Orchestra	"Chant of the Jungle"	Brunswick 4586	October 15, 1930	December 1930	US Billboard 1930 #13, US #1 for 3 weeks, 8 total weeks
14	Rudy Vallee and His Connecticut Yankees	"You're Driving Me Crazy"	Columbia 2297D	September 10, 1930	October 1930	US Billboard 1930 #14, US #3 for 9 total weeks, 58,458 sales
15	Ted Weems Orchestra w_Art Jarrett	"The Man from the South"	Victor 22238	December 21, 1929	February 1930	US Billboard 1930 #15, US #1 for 1 week, 8 total weeks, 53,277 sales
16	Leo Reisman and His Orchestra	"Bye Bye Blues"	Victor 22459	June 17, 1930	August 1930	US Billboard 1930 #16, US #17 for 1 week, 1 total week, 52,811 sales
17	Leo Reisman and His Orchestra	"What is This Thing Called Love?"	Victor 22282	January 20, 1930	February 1930	US Billboard 1930 #17, US #5 for 1 week, 9 total weeks, 51,254 sales
18	Benny Meroff Orchestra	"Happy Days are Here Again"	Brunswick 4709	December 12, 1929	January 1930	US Billboard 1930 #18, US #1 for 3 weeks, 8 total weeks
19	Ben Selvin and His Orchestra (vocal Annette Hanshaw)	"Happy Days are Here Again"	Columbia 2116	February 1, 1930	February 1930	US Billboard 1930 #19, US #1 for 2 weeks, 11 total weeks
20	Harry Richman with Earl Burtnett Orchestra	"Puttin' On the Ritz"	Brunswick 4677	January 31, 1930	February 1930	US Billboard 1930 #20, US #1 for 2 weeks, 8 total weeks
21	Al Jolson	"Let Me Sing and I'm Happy"	Brunswick 4721	December 1, 1929	February 1930	US Billboard 1930 #21, US #2 for 2 weeks, 10 total weeks

== Top Blues Recordings ==
- "Clarksdale Moan" – Son House
- "Honky Tonk Train Blues" – Meade Lux Lewis (recorded 1927)
- "Preachin' Blues" – Son House
- "Razor Ball" – Blind Willie McTell
- "Sitting on Top of the World" – Mississippi Sheiks, National Recording Registry 2017
- "Skoodle Do Do" – Big Bill Broonzy
- "Somebody's Been Using That Thing" – Big Bill Broonzy

== Classical music ==
- William Alwyn – Piano Concerto No. 1
- Béla Bartók – Cantata Profana
- Arthur Bliss – Morning Heroes (oratorio)
- Aaron Copland – Piano Variations
- Jean Cras – Légende
- Arthur De Greef – Piano Concerto No. 2
- John Fernström - Symphony No. 3, Op. 20
- Alexander Glazunov – String Quartet No. 7
- Gabriel Grovlez – Sicilienne et allegro giocoso for bassoon and piano
- Reynaldo Hahn – Piano Concerto in E
- Howard Hanson – Symphony No. 2, Romantic
- Paul Hindemith –
  - Des kleinen Elektromusikers Lieblinge, for three trautoniums
  - Konzertmusik, Op. 48, for viola and chamber orchestra
  - Konzertmusik, Op. 49, for piano, brass, and two harps
  - Konzertmusik, Op. 50, for brass and strings
  - Triosatz (a.k.a. Rondo) for three guitars (date uncertain: possibly 1925)
- Mikhail Ippolitov-Ivanov – Turkish Fragments
- John Ireland –
  - Legend for piano and orchestra
  - Piano Concerto in E-flat
- Paul Juon – Quintet for Winds in B-flat major
- Zoltán Kodály – Dances of Marosszék
- Ernst Krenek –
  - Fiedellieder, for voice and piano, Op. 64
  - String Quartet No. 5, Op. 65
- Igor Markevitch – Concerto Grosso
- Maurice Ravel – Piano Concerto for the Left Hand
- Silvestre Revueltas – String Quartet No. 1
- Arnold Schoenberg –
  - Begleitungsmusik zu einer Lichtspielscene, for orchestra, Op. 34
  - Sechs Stücke, for male choir, Op. 35
- Ruth Crawford Seeger –
  - Piano Study in Mixed Accents
  - Four Diaphonic Suites
  - Three Chants for Female Chorus
- Jean Sibelius
  - 4 Pieces for Violin and Piano, Op.115
  - 3 Pieces for Violin and Piano, Op.116
  - Karelia's Fate
- Kaikhosru Shapurji Sorabji – Opus clavicembalisticum
- Igor Stravinsky – Symphony of Psalms
- Henri Tomasi – Paysages
- Heitor Villa-Lobos –
  - Bachianas brasileiras No. 1, for orchestra of cellos
  - Bachianas brasileiras No. 2, for small orchestra
- Anton Webern – Quartet, for clarinet, tenor saxophone, violin, and piano, Op. 22

== Opera ==
- Ralph Benatzky – The White Horse Inn
- Leoš Janáček – From the House of the Dead
- Ernst Krenek – Leben des Orest (first performance); Kehraus um St Stephan (composed 1930; first performance 1990)
- Kurt Weill – The Rise and Fall of the City of Mahagonny

== Musical theater ==
- Darling, I Love You – London production opened at the Gaiety Theatre on January 22 and ran for 147 performances
- Eldorado – London production opened at Daly's Theatre on September 3 and ran for 93 performances
- Ever Green – London production opened at the Adelphi Theatre on December 3 and ran for 254 performances
- Fine and Dandy – Broadway musical opened at the Erlanger's Theatre on September 23 and ran for 246 performances.
- Follow a Star London production opened at the Winter Garden Theatre on September 17 and ran for 118 performances
- Girl Crazy – Broadway production opened at the Alvin Theatre on October 14 and ran for 272 performances
- Here Comes the Bride – London production opened at the Piccadilly Theatre on February 20 and ran for 175 performances
- Das Land Des Lächelns – Vienna production opened at the Theater an der Wien on September 26 and ran for 105 performances
- Little Tommy Tucker – London production opened at Daly's Theatre on November 19 and ran for 83 performances
- The Love Race – London production opened at the Gaiety Theatre on June 25 and ran for 237 performances
- The New Yorkers (Book by Herbert Fields, Lyrics & Music by Cole Porter) – Broadway revue opened at the Broadway Theatre on December 8 and ran for 168 performances
- Nippy – London production opened at the Prince Edward Theatre on October 30 and ran for 137 performances
- Rio Rita – London production opened at the Prince Edward Theatre on April 3 and ran for 59 performances
- The Second Little Show – Broadway revue opened at the Royale Theatre on September 2 and ran for 63 performances
- Silver Wings – London production opened at the Dominion Theatre on February 14 and ran for 120 performances
- Sons o' Guns – London production opened at the Hippodrome on June 26 and ran for 211 performances
- Sweet and Low – Broadway revue opened at Chanin's 46th Street Theatre on November 17 and ran for 184 performances
- The Three Musketeers – London production opened at the Drury Lane Theatre on March 28 and ran for 240 performances
- Three's a Crowd – Broadway revue opened at the Selwyn Theatre on October 15 and ran for 271 performances
- The Vanderbilt Revue Broadway revue opened at the Vanderbilt Theatre on November 5 and ran for 13 performances
- Viktoria und ihr Husar – Vienna production opened at the Theater an der Wien on December 23 and ran for 121 performances
- The White Horse Inn – Ralph Benatzky. First performed at the Grosses Schauspielhaus in Berlin on November 8.
- Wonder Bar London production opened at the Savoy Theatre on December 5 and ran for 210 performances

== Musical films ==
- Along Came Youth starring Charles "Buddy" Rogers, Frances Dee and Stuart Erwin. Directed by Lloyd Corrigan and Norman McLeod.
- Animal Crackers, starring the Marx Brothers, Lillian Roth and Margaret Dumont. Directed by Victor Heerman.
- Be Yourself!, starring Fanny Brice, Harry Green and Robert Armstrong. Directed by Thornton Freeland.
- Big Boy, starring Al Jolson and Claudia Dell. Directed by Alan Crosland.
- The Big Pond, starring Maurice Chevalier and Claudette Colbert. Directed by Hobart Henley.
- Bride of the Regiment, starring Walter Pidgeon and Vivienne Segal
- Bright Lights, starring Dorothy Mackaill, Frank Fay, Noah Beery, Inez Courtney and Eddie Nugent. Directed by Michael Curtiz.
- Chasing Rainbows starring Bessie Love, Charles King, Jack Benny and Marie Dressler
- Children of Pleasure starring Lawrence Gray
- The Cuckoos starring Bert Wheeler and Robert Woolsey
- Dancing Sweeties starring Grant Withers, Sue Carol and Edna Murphy
- Dixiana starring Bebe Daniels and Everett Marshall
- End of the Rainbow (Das lockende Ziel), starring Richard Tauber, Lucie Englisch and Sophie Pagay, with music by Paul Dessau
- Follow Thru starring Charles "Buddy" Rogers, Nancy Carroll, Zelma O'Neal, Jack Haley, Eugene Pallette and Thelma Todd
- Going Wild starring Joe E. Brown and Ona Munson
- Golden Dawn, released on June 14, starring Walter Woolf King, Vivienne Segal, Noah Beery, Alice Gentle and Lupino Lane
- Good News, starring Bessie Love, Cliff Edwards and Penny Singleton and featuring Abe Lyman & his Band
- Heads Up, starring Charles "Buddy" Rogers and Helen Kane. Directed by Victor Schertzinger.
- High Society Blues, starring Janet Gaynor, Charles Farrell and Louise Fazenda
- Hit the Deck, starring Jack Oakie, Polly Walker and June Clyde
- Hold Everything, starring Winnie Lightner and Joe E. Brown
- Honey, starring Nancy Carroll, Lillian Roth and Mitzi Green
- In Gay Madrid, starring Ramón Novarro and Dorothy Jordan
- King of Jazz, starring Paul Whiteman and John Boles and featuring The Rhythm Boys and The Brox Sisters
- Leathernecking, starring Irene Dunne
- Let's Go Native, starring Jack Oakie, Jeanette MacDonald and James Hall
- Life of the Party, starring Winnie Lightner and Jack Whiting
- The Lottery Bride, starring Jeanette MacDonald, Zasu Pitts, Joe E. Brown and John Garrick. Directed by Paul L. Stein.
- Love Comes Along, starring Bebe Daniels
- Madam Satan, starring Kay Johnson and Reginald Denny
- Mammy, starring Al Jolson
- Maybe It's Love, starring Joe E. Brown, James Hall and Joan Bennett
- Monte Carlo, starring Jeanette MacDonald and Jack Buchanan. Directed by Ernst Lubitsch.
- New Movietone Follies of 1930 starring El Brendel and Marjorie White
- No, No Nanette starring ZaSu Pitts, Louise Fazenda, Lilyan Tashman and Mildred Harris
- Oh Sailor Behave starring Charles King and Irene Delroy
- Paramount on Parade featuring Maurice Chevalier and Clara Bow
- Puttin' on the Ritz starring Harry Richman, Joan Bennett and James Gleason
- Rendezvous (Komm' zu mir zum Rendezvous), starring Lucie Englisch, Ralph Arthur Roberts and Alexa Engström, with music by Artur Guttmann
- The Rogue Song released May 10 starring Lawrence Tibbett and Catherine Dale Owen and featuring Stan Laurel and Oliver Hardy
- She Couldn't Say No starring Winnie Lightner
- Show Girl In Hollywood starring Alice White
- Song o' My Heart released September 7 starring John McCormack.
- Song of the Flame starring Bernice Claire and Noah Beery
- Song of the West starring John Boles and Vivienne Segal
- Spring Is Here starring Lawrence Gray, Bernice Claire, Inez Courtney, Frank Albertson and The Brox Sisters.
- Sunny starring Marilyn Miller, Lawrence Gray and Joe Donahue.
- Sunny Skies starring Benny Rubin, Marceline Day, Rex Lease and Marjorie Kane
- Sweet Kitty Bellairs starring Claudia Dell and Walter Pidgeon
- Swing High starring Helen Twelvetress and Fred Scott
- Top Speed starring Bernice Claire, Jack Whiting and Joe E. Brown
- Under a Texas Moon starring Frank Fay, Myrna Loy and Noah Beery
- Under the Roofs of Paris (Sous les toits de Paris) starring Albert Préjean, with music by Armand Bernard, Raoul Moretti and René Nazelles
- The Immortal Vagabond (Der unsterbliche Lump), starring Liane Haid, Gustav Fröhlich and Hans Adalbert Schlettow.
- The Vagabond King starring Dennis King, Jeanette MacDonald and Lillian Roth
- Viennese Nights released November 26 starring Vivienne Segal, Jean Hersholt, Walter Pidgeon and Louise Fazenda.
- What a Widow! starring Gloria Swanson
- When Naples Sings (Napoli che canta), starring Malcolm Tod, with music by Ernesto Tagliaferri
- Whoopee! starring Eddie Cantor, Ethel Shutta and featuring George Olsen & his Orchestra and Betty Grable
- Young Man of Manhattan starring Claudette Colbert, Ginger Rogers, Norman Foster and Charles Ruggles. Directed by Monta Bell.

== Births ==
- January 2 – Julius La Rosa, American singer (d. 2016)
- January 5 – Don Rondo, American singer (d. 2011)
- January 7 – Jack Greene, American country music singer-songwriter (d. 2013)
- January 10 – Lyle Ritz, American jazz ukulele musician (d. 2017)
- January 12 – Glenn Yarbrough, American folk singer (The Limelighters) (d. 2016)
- January 13 – Bobby Lester, American singer (The Moonglows) (d. 1980)
- January 17 – Dick Contino, American accordionist and singer (d. 2017)
- January 27
  - Bobby Blue Bland, American blues and soul singer (d. 2013)
  - Usko Meriläinen, Finnish composer (d. 2004)
- January 29 – Derek Bailey, English guitarist (d. 2005)
- January 31 – Al De Lory, American record producer, arranger, musician (d. 2012)
- February 7 – Ikutaro Kakehashi, Japanese electronic music engineer (d. 2017)
- February 22 – Marni Nixon, American soprano, best known for film dubbing (d. 2016)
- February 26 – Chic Hetti, American pianist and vocalist (The Playmates)
- March 1 – Gagik Hovunts, Armenian composer (d. 2019)
- March 6 – Lorin Maazel, American conductor (d. 2014)
- March 9 – Ornette Coleman, American jazz saxophonist, trumpeter and composer (d. 2015)
- March 13
  - Liz Anderson, American country music singer and songwriter (d. 2011)
  - Jan Howard, American country singer (d. 2020)
  - Blue Mitchell, American trumpet player (d. 1979)
- March 17 – Paul Horn, American jazz and new age flautist (d. 2014)
- March 22 – Stephen Sondheim, American musical theater composer and lyricist (d. 2021)
- March 26 – Sivuca, Brazilian guitarist and accordionist (d. 2006)
- March 28 – Robert Ashley, American composer (d. 2014)
- March 29 – Donny Conn, American drummer (The Playmates) (d. 2015)
- March 30 – Sterling Betancourt, Trinidadian steelpan player
- April 5 – Mary Costa, American opera singer and actress
- April 8 – Pepe Villalobos, Peruvian musician and compser (d. 2026)
- April 10 – Claude Bolling, French jazz pianist and composer (d. 2020)
- April 16 – Herbie Mann, American jazz flutist (d. 2003)
- April 17 – Chris Barber, English jazz trombonist and bandleader (d. 2021)
- April 18 – Jean Guillou, French composer, organist, pianist and pedagogue (d. 2019)
- April 28 – Wanda Warska, Polish jazz vocalist (d. 2019)
- May 1 – Little Walter, American blues musician (d. 1968)
- May 4 – Katherine Jackson, matriarch of The Jackson 5
- May 8 – Heather Harper, Northern Irish operatic soprano (d. 2019)
- May 16 – Friedrich Gulda, Austrian pianist and composer (d. 2000)
- May 22 – Kenny Ball, English jazz trumpeter, singer and bandleader (d. 2013)
- May 28 – Julian Slade, English musical theatre writer (d. 2006)
- May 31 – Uno Loop, Estonian singer and guitarist (d. 2021)
- June 3 – Dakota Staton, American jazz vocalist (d. 2007)
- June 4 – Morgana King, American jazz vocalist (d. 2018)
- June 9
  - Buddy Bregman, American composer and conductor (d. 2017)
  - Monique Serf, French singer ("Barbara") (d. 1997)
- June 17 – Romuald Twardowski, Polish composer, pianist and organist (d. 2024)
- July 2 – Ahmad Jamal, American jazz pianist and composer (died 2023)
- July 3 – Carlos Kleiber, Austrian conductor (d. 2004)
- July 6 – M. Balamuralikrishna, Indian Carnatic vocalist, multi-instrumentalist, playback singer, composer and actor (d. 2016)
- July 10 – Josephine Veasey, English operatic mezzo-soprano (d. 2022)
- July 16 – Guy Béart, French singer-songwriter (d. 2015)
- July 20
  - Sally Ann Howes, English actress and singer
  - Oleg Anofriyev, Russian actor, singer, songwriter, film director and poet (d. 2018)
- July 21 – Helen Merrill, American jazz vocalist
- July 25 – Annie Ross, British-American singer (died 2020)
- July 27 – Andy White, Scottish-born session drummer (d. 2015)
- July 28 – Firoza Begum, Bangladeshi singer (d. 2014)
- August 1
  - Lionel Bart, English composer and lyricist (d. 1999)
  - Walter Jagiello, Polish polka musician and songwriter (d. 2006)
- August 6 – Abbey Lincoln, American singer (d. 2010)
- August 7 – Veljo Tormis, Estonian composer (d. 2017)
- August 10 – Jorma Panula, Finnish conductor and composer
- August 11 – Heinz Werner Zimmermann, German composer (d. 2022)
- August 16 – Flor Silvestre, Mexican singer, actress and equestrienne (d. 2020)
- August 24 – Tony Davis, English folk singer (The Spinners) (d. 2017)
- September 7
  - Paul-Baudouin Michel, Belgian composer and musicologist (d. 2020)
  - Sonny Rollins, American jazz saxophonist and composer (d. 2026)
- September 12 – Larry Austin, American composer (d. 2018)
- September 23 – Ray Charles, American soul musician (d. 2004)
- September 26 – Fritz Wunderlich, German tenor singer (d. 1966)
- September 27 – Igor Kipnis, German-born American harpsichordist (d. 2002)
- September 29
  - Richard Bonynge, Australian pianist and conductor
  - Billy Strange, American singer-songwriter and guitarist (d. 2012)
- October 1 – Richard Harris, Irish actor and singer (d. 2002)
- October 5 – John Carmichael, pianist, composer and music therapist
- October 8 – Tōru Takemitsu, composer (d. 1996)
- October 12 – Cyril Tawney, English traditional singer-songwriter (d. 2005)
- October 23 – Boozoo Chavis, American accordionist (d. 2001)
- October 24 – The Big Bopper, American DJ and singer (d. 1959)
- October 29
  - Omara Portuondo, Cuban singer and dancer
  - Natalie Sleeth, American composer (d. 1992)
- October 30
  - Clifford Brown, American jazz trumpeter (d. 1956)
  - Stanley Sadie, English musicologist (d. 2005)
- November 12 – Bob Crewe, American singer, songwriter, manager, and producer (d. 2014)
- November 18 – Jerzy Artysz, Polish operatic baritone (d. 2024)
- November 20 – Curly Putman, American songwriter (d. 2016)
- November 22 – Peter Hurford, English organist and composer (d. 2019)
- December 4 – Jim Hall, American guitarist and composer (d. 2013)
- December 17 – Makoto Moroi, Japanese composer (d. 2013)
- December 18 – Don Heckman, American jazz saxophonist, music critic, music journalist, and composer (d. 2020)
- December 31 – Odetta, American singer, songwriter and civil rights activist (d. 2008)
- Date unknown – Munir Bashir, Iraqi Assyrian musician and oud player (d. 1997)

== Deaths ==
- January 2 – Therese Malten, German operatic soprano, 74
- January 16 – Art Hickman, American bandleader, 43 (Banti's syndrome)
- January 17 – Gauhar Jaan, Indian singer and dancer, 56
- January 24 – Mario Sammarco, Italian operatic baritone, 61
- January 26 – William H. Rieger, American tenor, 67
- January 27 – Jean Huré, composer and organist (born 1877)
- January 28 – Emmy Destinn Czech operatic soprano, 51 (stroke)
- February 12 – Eva Dell'Acqua, Belgian singer and composer, 73
- February 13 – Conrad Ansorge, German pianist, teacher and composer, 67
- February 17 – Louise Kirkby Lunn, English operatic contralto, 56
- February 23 – Horst Wessel, Nazi ideologue and composer, 22
- March 7 – A. L. Erlanger, American theatrical impresario, 70
- March 13 – August Stradal, virtuoso pianist and composer, 69
- March 16 – George Allan, English arranger and composer, 55
- April 1 – Cosima Wagner, daughter of Franz Liszt and widow of Richard Wagner, 92
- April 3 – Emma Albani, Canadian-British operatic soprano (born 1847)
- April 5 – Gene Greene, singer and composer ("The Ragtime King"), 48
- April 9 – Rose Caron, French operatic soprano, 72
- April 24 – Adele Ritchie, American singer, comic opera, musical comedy and vaudeville, 55
- April 26 – Beth Slater Whitson, American lyric writer, 50
- April 28 – Charles Grandmougin, lyricist (born 1850)
- May 1 – Emil Genetz, Finnish composer, 77
- May 29 – Tivadar Nachéz, Hungarian violinist and composer, 71
- June 5 – Irma Reichová, Czech operatic soprano, 71
- June 7 – Nahan Franko, American violinist and conductor, 68
- June 22 – Mary Davies, Welsh singer, 75
- July 15 – Leopold Auer, Hungarian violinist, 85
- August 4 – Siegfried Wagner, German composer and conductor, son of Richard Wagner, 61
- August 9 – Johnny Burke, Canadian singer and songwriter (b. 1851)
- August 20 – George John Bennett, English composer (born 1863)
- October 1 – Riccardo Drigo, Italian composer and conductor, 84
- October 14 – Henry Creamer, American songwriter, 51
- October 27 – Evan Stephens, American Mormon composer and hymn-writer, 76
- November 13 – Thomas Bulch, English-born Australian musician and composer, 67
- November 14 – Jacques Isnardon, French operatic bass-baritone, 70
- December 17 – Peter Warlock, English composer, 36
- December 22 – Charles K. Harris, American songwriter and publisher, 63
- December 23 – Marie Fillunger, Austrian singer, 80
- December 24 – Oskar Nedbal, Czech violist, conductor and composer, 56
- December 29 – Oscar Borg, Norwegian composer, 79
