= A Symposium on Popular Songs =

1962 film by Bill Justice

- A Symposium on Popular Songs poster
- Directed by: Bill Justice
- Written by: Xavier Atencio
- Produced by: Walt Disney
- Starring: Paul Frees; Gloria Wood; Billy Storm; Skip Farrell
- Production company: Walt Disney Productions
- Distributed by: Buena Vista Distribution
- Release date: December 19, 1962
- Running time: 20 minutes
- Country: United States
- Language: English

A Symposium on Popular Songs is a special cartoon featurette made by Walt Disney Productions in 1962. It features songs that were written by the Sherman Brothers, with music arrangements by Tutti Camarata. The Shermans also co-wrote the screenplay but are not credited for this. Host Ludwig Von Drake invites his audience into his mansion where he tells all about popular music through the years, introducing several songs illustrated with stop-motion photography. The film was nominated for an Academy Award for Best Animated Short Film.

== Songs ==
=== "The Rutabaga Rag" ===
"The Rutabaga Rag", performed by Paul Frees as Ludwig Von Drake, was not written as a parody of ragtime, but rather as an authentic ragtime song. In the course of the film's narration, Von Drake claims to have invented ragtime music and, specifically, this song. During the song, a variety of stop-motion animated vegetables with faces appear and dance to the song.

=== "Charleston Charlie" ===
"Charleston Charlie", performed by Betty Boopie Doop (Gloria Wood), makes direct reference to the singing style exemplified by Helen Kane in her flapper era iconic song "He's So Unusual", which was co-written by the Sherman Brothers' Tin Pan Alley songwriting father, Al Sherman in 1929. The subject of both songs is a male college student whom the singer desires. "Charleston Charlie" begins with the Betty Boop-esque lyric "Boop boop be doop".

In the film, Ludwig Von Drake claims he wrote the song when traveling below the Mason–Dixon line. "Mr. Dixon" approached Drake and asked him to put "Dixie" on the map. For this reason, he wrote a song originally entitled, "Louisville Ludwig", but later changed the name to "Charleston Charlie" in order to protect the innocent, namely himself.

=== "Although I Dropped $100,000" ===
Also known as "Although I Dropped a Hundred Thousand in the Market, Baby (I Found a Million Dollars in Your Smile)", and performed by Rah, Rah Rudy (Frees) and his Megaphone Boys, this song makes a subtle reference to the singing style exemplified by Ted Lewis in "Wear a Hat with a Silver Lining" which was co-written by the Sherman Brothers' father, Al Sherman. Throughout the spoken middle part of the song, reference is made to numerous Depression era songs including the iconic Al Sherman/Al Lewis classic "Now's the Time to Fall in Love", "Let a Smile Be Your Umbrella", and "Stormy Weather".

According to film critic, Leonard Maltin, this song as well as "Charleston Charlie" are homages to Al Sherman and his songs. In the context of the film, Ludwig Von Drake claims he wrote the song and it became all the rage at the beginning of the Great Depression.

=== "I'm Blue for You, Boo-Boo-Boo-Boo-Boo" ===
"I'm Blue for You, Boo-Boo-Boo-Boo-Boo", performed by Fosby Crooner (Skip Farrell), is a tribute to Bing Crosby's signature crooning style. Crooning elements, such as the repetition of "Boo boo boo boo boo", the whistling of the melody, and over-rhyming of the word "heart", are placed throughout the song.

Crosby worked with Disney before in "The Legend of Sleepy Hollow" from The Adventures of Ichabod and Mr. Toad.

The Sherman Brothers' father, Al Sherman, wrote several songs which were sung by Bing Crosby in the 1930s and 1940s. In 1970, Robert and Richard Sherman had a chance, in their own right, to work with the legendary Crosby on the made-for-television musical production of Goldilocks.

=== "The Boogie Woogie Bakery Man" ===
"The Boogie Woogie Bakery Man", performed by the Sister Sisters (Betty Allan, Diane Pendleton and Gloria Wood), had a structure and arrangement closely styled after The Andrews Sisters' hit song, "Boogie Woogie Bugle Boy". The song makes direct and indirect references to the singing style exemplified by the Andrews Sisters, as well as numerous songs from the swing era which was the heyday of their career. The very first line of the song references several swing era songs: "He's my Boogie Woogie Chattanooga Sentimental Oriental Fortune Cookie Bakery Man".

The song itself is about an "oriental" baker of fortune cookies. At the time, the song was written, the use of the term "oriental" was quite common. However, in recent decades, the term has increasingly been seen to be offensive when used to describe an individual from the Far East.

The Andrews Sisters worked with Disney before in "Johnnie Fedora and Alice Bluebonnet" from Make Mine Music and "Little Toot" from Melody Time.

In 1974, twelve years after A Symposium on Popular Songs was first released, the Sherman Brothers worked with the Andrews Sisters on the Tony Award winning show, Over Here!, which was also an homage to the 1940s swing era music of the day.

=== "Puppy Love Is Here to Stay" ===
"Puppy Love Is Here to Stay", performed by Jackie Babalon (Billy Storm) and the Babaloonians, is the penultimate song in the film. With the exception of the "harder-edged" "Rock, Rumble and Roar", it is meant to represent relatively modern music. Although the Sherman Brothers made their name on writing songs much like this one, this song is different in that it partially parodies songs like it, exploring the perceived innocence of Eisenhower's 1950s America. There are references to songs such as "Blue Moon" by The Marcels and Annette Funicello's version of "Puppy Love".

=== "Rock, Rumble and Roar" ===
"Rock, Rumble and Roar" is the final song from the film and sung by Paul Frees, Gloria Wood, Skip Farrell, Betty Allan, and Diane Pendleton. The song is meant to be the most modern of the songs from the film, and also revisits the six previous songs. This song is a homage to the popular, early rock and roll song, "Shake, Rattle and Roll". It is the second song in the featurette to be sung by Ludwig Von Drake.

== Analysis ==
Animation historian Christopher P. Lehman notes that this film illustrates music history through use of humor, following a formula that the Disney studio had previously used in Toot, Whistle, Plunk and Boom (1953). In this case Ludwig Von Drake plays the songs which he supposedly helped popularize, covering musical styles from the 1900s decade to the 1960s. Certain segments of the film use stop motion animation. The technique was unusual for a Disney film, but did not mark the first time the studio used it in a film. It had earlier been used in Noah's Ark (1959), a well-received animated short. Noah's Ark had actually been nominated for an Academy Award for Best Animated Short Film.

Lehman finds it remarkable for the time of the film's release, that A Symposium recognizes African-American music as part of American musical history in the 20th century. Though he notes that African Americans as an ethnic group are not mentioned in the film, several of the musical styles used have their roots in musical styles developed by Black people. One of the earliest famous songs introduced by Ludwig in the film is a ragtime piece, a genre which Lehman notes was pioneered by African-American composer Scott Joplin. Among the last and most modern songs showcased in the film are a couple of rock and roll numbers, a music genre which has its roots in the African-American rhythm and blues. Lehman points that in the years preceding the release, rock and roll and its African-American roots were still controversial. The music genre had been derisively described as "nigger music". Yet here, not only does Ludwig showcase rock and roll songs, but he plays guitar and sings a rock song for the conclusion; this was seen as an innovative move, since no theatrical star of the time had actually performed as a rock singer.

Lehman finds the film to be part of a trend in the Disney animated studio of using more sympathetic portrayals of African Americans, Africans, and African-American music over time. During World War II, Disney animated shorts seemed to associate musicians wearing zoot suit and boogie-woogie, an ancestor of rock and roll, with threatening forces and the Axis powers themselves. Disney had a long history of portraying animated black characters as buffoons and/or servants. He cites as a late example the portrayal of indigenous Africans in Social Lion (1954). They were depicted as "sleepy-eyed" people, wearing grass skirts, and employed as servants of White hunters. A few years later, in Paul Bunyan (1958), Disney gave a more sympathetic portrayal of a black character. In a brief tribute to other American folk heroes besides Paul Bunyan himself, the film depicted among them a black man: John Henry. The Disney staff gave Henry a muscular physique and treated him as a hero. Though Lehman notes that the film never depicted Henry's face, which was hidden between his arms. Disney was apparently becoming more progressive with time and breaking with the traditions of stereotypical portrayal of blacks in animation.

Lehman notes that Disney's newfound ethnic sensitivity, when it came to African American culture, did not extend to the portrayal of Asian Americans. The stop-motion scenes of A Symposium includes two Asian characters as two puppets with stereotypical slanty eyes.

== Home media ==
The short was released on DVD on December 6, 2005, on Walt Disney Treasures: Disney Rarities - Celebrated Shorts: 1920s–1960s.

== See also ==
- List of American films of 1962

== Sources ==
- Lehman, Christopher P. (2007), "The Cartoons of 1961-1962", American Animated Cartoons of the Vietnam Era: A Study of Social Commentary in Films and Television Programs, 1961-1973, McFarland & Company, ISBN 978-0786451425
