= Over Somebody Else's Shoulder =

"Over Somebody Else's Shoulder" is a hit song written by Al Sherman & Al Lewis in 1934 at the end of the Tin Pan Alley era. It was introduced by singer and bandleader, Ozzie Nelson who enjoyed great success with the song. It was further covered by Freddy Martin and his Orchestra with the vocal performed by Elmer Feldkamp. The original release of the song was on February 13, 1934 to coincide with Valentine's Day. It was also covered by Eddie Cantor. Twenty four years later, in 1958 country singer, Sonny James covered the song on his album entitled, Honey which was released by Capitol Records (Capitol T-988).
