= Lindbergh (The Eagle of the U.S.A.) =

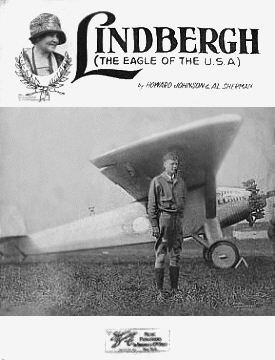
Sheet Music cover from the 1927 song, "Lindbergh (The Eagle of the USA)".

"Lindbergh (The Eagle of the U.S.A.)" was a popular song written by famous Tin Pan Alley songwriters, Howard Johnson and Al Sherman in 1927. It chronicles Charles Lindbergh's famous pioneer solo-flight across the Atlantic Ocean in the Spirit of St. Louis. The song was an overnight hit being released immediately on the heels of Lindbergh's safe landing.

== Recordings ==
Victor Records # 20674, side A, Vernon Dalhart, singer. Joel Whitburn estimates this recording would have appeared on the Billboard Hot 100 chart beginning August 1927, achieving a position of #4.
Oriole Records (U.S.) # 922, side A, Harry Crane, singer.
Edison Blue Amberol Cylinder # 5362, Vernon Dalhart, singer.

== Literary sources ==
- Sherman, Robert B. (1998). Walt's Time: from before to beyond. Santa Clarita: Camphor Tree Publishers.
