= Now's the Time to Fall in Love =

"Now's The Time To Fall In Love" is a 1931 song from the Depression era written by Tin Pan Alley tunesmiths Al Sherman and Al Lewis and published by De Sylva, Brown and Henderson. The song was made popular by Eddie Cantor on his weekly radio show. The song takes a positive attitude toward the plummeting prices of storebought items in financially depressed America of the 1930s.

The song was used in the popular 1953 motion picture about Eddie Cantor's life, The Eddie Cantor Story. It is referenced in the 1962 Academy Award-nominated Disney animated short musical film A Symposium on Popular Songs during the song "Although I Dropped $100,000", written by Al Sherman's songwriter sons, Robert and Richard Sherman.

== Bibliography ==
- Sherman, Robert B., Walt's Time: From Before to Beyond, Santa Clarita: Camphor Tree Publishers, 1998.
