= On a Little Bamboo Bridge =

"On a Little Bamboo Bridge" was a hit song in 1937 for iconic band leader Louis Armstrong. Music and Lyrics were written by Al Sherman and Archie Fletcher who were frequent collaborators. The copyright is held by Joe Morris Music Company, Incorporated.

== Trivia ==
Years later, in the 1960s, Armstrong recorded two songs written by Al Sherman's sons, Richard and Robert Sherman. Those songs were "'Bout Time" and "Ten Feet off the Ground", originally from the Walt Disney musical film, The One and Only, Genuine, Original Family Band.

On a little bamboo bridge

By the waters of Kalua

Beneath Hawaiian skies

I fell in love with you

== Literary Sources ==
- Sherman, Robert B. Walt's Time: from before to beyond, Santa Clarita: Camphor Tree Publishers, 1998.
