= He's So Unusual =

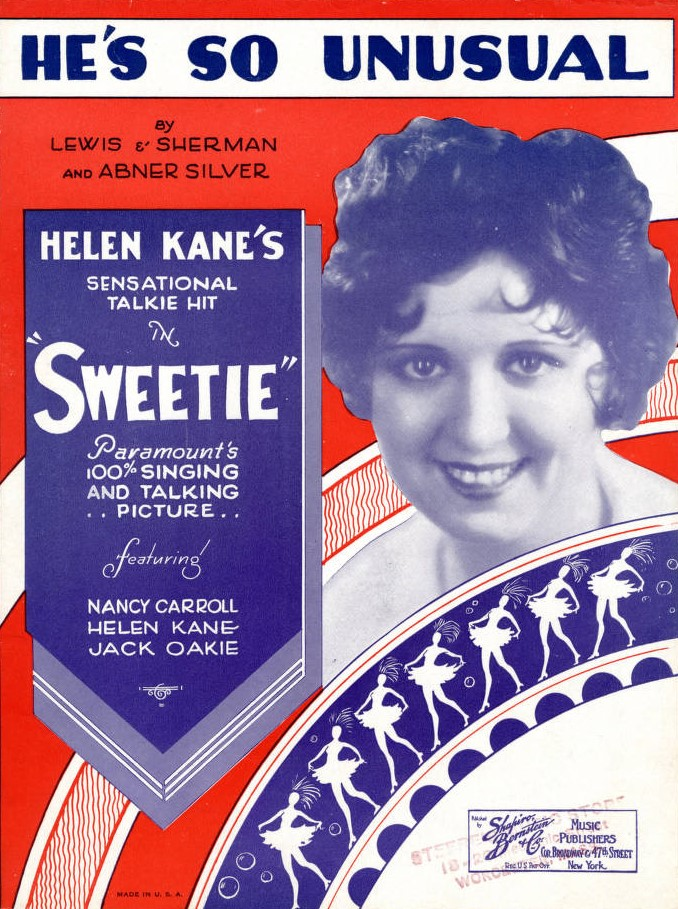
- Sheet music cover, 1929

Single by Helen Kane
- Released: June 14, 1929
- Label: Shapiro, Bernstein & Co. Inc.
- Songwriters: Al Sherman, Al Lewis, Abner Silver

Helen Kane singles chronology
"I'd Do Anything for You" (1929)	"He's So Unusual" (1929)	"Ain'tcha?" (1929)

"He's So Unusual" is a song from the late 1920s performed by Helen Kane, who was the inspiration for the Betty Boop character. The song was written by Al Sherman, Al Lewis and Abner Silver. Released on June 14, 1929, "He's So Unusual" was featured in the motion picture Sweetie. Shapiro, Bernstein & Co. Inc. are the publishers of record.

== Helen Kane ==
This song is one of the Boop-styled songs which Kane sang. This is evidenced in the signature line featured in the lyric. This song and "I Wanna Be Loved by You" are two notable "Boop" songs, although Kane sang several other songs in this persona as well, such as "Button Up Your Overcoat," "That's My Weakness Now," and others.

== Homage ==
The song is referenced in the 1962 Academy Award-nominated animated short Disney musical film A Symposium on Popular Songs during the song "Charleston Charlie", written by Al Sherman's songwriter sons: Robert & Richard Sherman.

== Cyndi Lauper version ==
"He's So Unusual" was later covered by Cyndi Lauper, in a short (45 second) version, on her Grammy Award-winning album She's So Unusual. The sung lyrics continue in the background of the subsequent song, "Yeah Yeah", while the beginning of the song plays before "Girls Just Want to Have Fun" in the song's music video.
