= Larry Stock =

American songwriter (1896–1984)

- Born: Lazarus Goldberger; December 4, 1896; Manhattan, New York City, U.S.
- Died: May 4, 1984 (aged 87); Lakehurst, New Jersey, U.S.
- Other names: Lawrence Rosenstock
- Occupations: Songwriter; pianist; composer
- Notable work: "Blueberry Hill"; "You're Nobody till Somebody Loves You"; "Morning Side of the Mountain"

Larry Stock (born Lazarus Goldberger; December 4, 1896 – May 4, 1984) was an American songwriter. He is most known for being a songwriter and composer for many Pop and Jazz songs including "Blueberry Hill" which was later recorded by Fats Domino.

== Early life ==
Stock was born 'Lazarus Goldberger' on December 4, 1896, in Manhattan, New York City, the son of Adolf Goldberger and Ella Ehrlich. His father was an Austrian immigrant who was a cellist for the New York Symphony Orchestra. His mother's family had emigrated from Hungary to New York in 1888. At a year old, his father Adolf died in 1898. In 1901, his mother Ella Goldberger married Abram Rosenstock. His name was then changed to Lawrence Rosenstock which later became shortened to Larry Stock. At a young age, he often practiced and played piano.

== Career ==
At twelve, he was accepted by the Institute of Musical Art in New York which later became the Juilliard School. After graduating at sixteen he continued his studies at the City College of New York. He studied piano with a prominent teacher and pianist named Clarence Adler. He briefly served in the Navy, but continued his study of music. He went on to perform at various nightclubs as it was difficult to find any jobs as a concert artist during the Great Depression.

He would use his leftover time for songwriting which would go unrecognized until 1938 when enjoyed his first major success for "The Umbrella Man". He would go on to compose and write other songs. He co-wrote the Fats Domino hit with Al Lewis "Blueberry Hill", the Dean Martin hit "You're Nobody till Somebody Loves You", "Morning Side of the Mountain" (recorded by Tommy Edwards and The Osmonds), and "You Won't Be Satisfied (Until You Break My Heart)", a hit by Doris Day featuring Les Brown and his orchestra. In 1960, he composed the Nat King Cole Christmas song "A Christmas in Bethlehem". Among the many singers who recorded his music were Louis Armstrong, Elvis Presley, Dean Martin, Frank Sinatra, Perry Como, Ella Fitzgerald, Marie Osmond, Nat King Cole, Bing Crosby and Guy Lombardo.

A second cousin named Jerry Wexler became well known in a different music field, coining the phrase "Rhythm and Blues", and being one of the founders of Atlantic Records.

== Death and legacy ==
He died May 4, 1984, in Lakehurst, New Jersey, at the age of 87.

In 1987, he was posthumously awarded an ASCAP award for "Blueberry Hill" along with Al Lewis and Vincent Rose.

He was posthumously inducted into the Songwriters Hall of Fame in 1998.
