= Wanita =

"Wanita (Wanna Eat, Wanna Eat)"

Song by Al Jolson
- B-side: "Jimbo Jambo" by Frank Crumit
- Released: 1923
- Recorded: January 4, 1923
- Studio: Chicago, Illinois
- Genre: Traditional Pop
- Length: 2:54
- Label: Columbia
- Songwriter(s): Al Sherman; Sam Coslow

Al Jolson singles chronology
"Toot, Toot, Tootsie" (1922)	"Wanita (Wanna Eat, Wanna Eat)" (1923)	"California, Here I Come" (1924)

"Wanita" is a song made popular by Al Jolson in 1923. Written by Tin Pan Alley songwriters, Al Sherman and Sam Coslow, it was their first hit song. The song is about a man who is love with a girl (Juanita) who only wants nothing to do with him so he wrote this song to win her back.

The song is alternatively titled "Juanita" or "Wanita (Wanna Eat, Wanna Eat)".
