= Songwriters on Parade =

Vaudeville revue that toured between 1931 and 1940

Songwriters on Parade was a musical Vaudeville revue which featured hit songwriters of the day introduced by a master of ceremonies. Between 1931 and 1940 (at least) various line-ups of popular songwriters performed their hits across the eastern seaboard at Loew's move theatres and on the Keith vaudeville circuit.

== Partial list of featured songwriters between 1932–1940 ==
- Sidney Clare
- Jack Lawrence
- Al Lewis
- Gerald Marks
- Vincent Rose
- Walter Samuels
- Jean Schwartz
- Al Sherman
- Abner Silver
- Nat Simon
- Charles Tobias
- Henry Tobias
- Percy Wenrich

== Literary sources ==
- Sherman, Robert B. Walt's Time: from before to beyond. Chapter 2; "Al's Time", p. 95. Santa Clarita: Camphor Tree Publishers, 1998.
