= Samuel Sherman =

Ukrainian-American composer and conductor (1871–1948)

- Samuel Sherman in 1909

Background information
- Birth name: Samuel Sherman
- Born: 1871; Stepantsi (Stepenitz), Cherkasy oblast, Ukraine formerly Russian Empire
- Died: 1948; New York City, New York, U.S.
- Genres: Chamber music
- Occupation(s): concert master, violinist and sometime composer.
- Instrument: violin
- Years active: 1903–1948

Samuel Sherman (1871–1948) was the court composer and conductor for Emperor Franz Josef I of the Austro-Hungarian Empire between 1903 and 1909.

== Early life ==
Sherman was born to a Jewish family in Stepantsi (called Stepenitz in Yiddish), a small fishing village near Kyiv, Ukraine. His father, Otto Sherman, was a clarinet player while Samuel and his younger brothers all studied the violin. In order to avoid conscription into Russian Czar Nicholas II's army, in 1903, aged 32, Sherman fled Stepinetz, leaving his wife Lena and four young children behind. He eventually found his way to Prague (then part of the Austro-Hungarian Empire), where his fortunes were to improve.

== Prague ==
Within a year of his arrival, Samuel was appointed concertmaster, first violinist and intermittent court composer in the Royal Court of Emperor Franz Josef. Once Sherman had secured a position in the orchestra, wife Lena and their children, Olga, Avrum (later "Al" or "Albert"), Edith and Regina arrived in Prague where they lived for about six years.

== New York ==
In 1909, the Sherman family emigrated once again, this time to the United States, settling in New York City. In America, Sherman found difficulty getting orchestra work which he deemed worthy of his talent and résumé. In 1910 Lena gave birth to their fifth child, a son named Harold. In 1911, Samuel separated from Lena leaving her to take care of their children.

== Musical legacy ==
In his absence, Sherman's thirteen-year-old son, Al Sherman, was forced to quit school to become the family's primary money earner. He took various odd jobs but his father specifically forbid him from becoming a musician. Nevertheless, Al was drawn toward music and taught himself the piano in secret. Eventually he became good enough to join the Musicians' Union. Samuel learned of his son's vocation when one day the Union sent teenaged Sherman to play piano in Sherman's orchestra. Al would continue in the music business, against Samuel's direct orders eventually becoming a successful Tin Pan Alley songwriter from the 1920s-1950s. Al's sons Robert and Richard would also follow in their grandfather's footsteps becoming world renowned songwriters. Robert's son, fourth generation songwriter, Robert J. Sherman continues the songwriting line in the twenty-first century.

== Death and the Stradivarius ==
After World War I, Samuel found less and less demand for his style of pre-war music. He eventually disbanded his orchestra and spent the last thirty-six years of his life working as a violinist in a small, indistinct Italian restaurant in Brooklyn. One morning, in the Winter of 1948, he was eating a breakfast at Yonah's restaurant when he toppled from his stool – dead. In his pocket was $1.25. At his side was the violin he had purchased fifty years earlier. His belongings were taken to the Clinton Street Police Station. Lt. Jeremiah Daly, who knew Sherman and had liked to hear him play, picked up the violin. The inscription on the inside read: 'Antonius Stradivarius, Cremonenfas . . . . Facie bat Anno 1717.'"
