= Idle Chatter =

- 45 RPM vinyl cover artwork

Single by Andrews Sisters
- Released: 1952
- Recorded: May 26, 1952
- Genre: Popular Music
- Length: 2:44
- Label: Decca Records
- Songwriter(s): Al Sherman
- based on the ballet Dance of the Hours

"Idle Chatter" is a popular song written by Al Sherman and recorded by the Andrews Sisters with the Nelson Riddle Orchestra. The music is adapted from the popular 19th-century ballet, Dance of the Hours by Ponchielli. The song was recorded on May 26, 1952, and released later that year.
