= Buddy Fields =

Buddy Fields may refer to:

- Buddy Fields (baseball) (James C. Field, born 1890), American pitcher
- Buddy Fields (songwriter) (1889−1965), American songwriter
