= You Gotta Be a Football Hero =

Song
- Written: Al Sherman; Buddy Fields; Al Lewis
- Released: 1933

"You Gotta Be a Football Hero" is a song written by Al Sherman, Buddy Fields and Al Lewis in 1933. It is one of the most widely recorded and performed American football anthems of all time.

== Recording artists ==
- Fred Waring and his Pennsylvanians
- Ben Bernie (charted 1933)
- Tuxedo Junction
- Crew Cuts
- Ralph Flanagan Orchestra
- Dick Haymes
- Notre Dame Glee Club
- Soul Touchers Band & Chorus
- Harry Reser and his Eskimos

== The 1935 Popeye cartoon ==
In 1935, "You Gotta Be a Football Hero" was the subject of a Popeye the Sailor cartoon. The film was produced by the Fleischer Studios and distributed by Adolph Zukor. Popeye, Olive Oyl, Bluto and J. Wellington Wimpy were each featured in the cartoon. It was released on August 31, 1935. The short film was directed by Dave Fleischer and produced by Max Fleischer. It was the last Popeye cartoon to feature Billy Costello as the voice of Popeye.

- Plotline Summary: Popeye and Bluto play professional football.

The animators credited (and uncredited) include: Willard Bowsky, Nick Tafuri, George Germantetti, Harold Walker, Bill Sturm and Orestes Calpini. The film was originally produced in black and white but was colorized in the late 1980s. It was released produced in the United States of America.

== Uses in other motion pictures ==
- The Longest Yard (1974)
- The Cat in the Hat (2003)
- Revenge of the Nerds

== Literary sources ==
- Sherman, Robert B. Walt's Time: from before to beyond, Santa Clarita: Camphor Tree Publishers, 1998.
