= Nine Little Miles from Ten-Ten-Tennessee =

"Nine Little Miles from Ten-Ten-Tennessee" is a song written by Al Sherman, Al Lewis and Con Conrad. It was recorded by Duke Ellington on November 21, 1930, by Victor Records #22586 64812-1/2. The song is ASCAP code: (Title Code: 360000160)
