= Blueberry Hill =

Single by Fats Domino

- 1940 sheet music

Song
- Published: 1940 by Chappell & Company, New York
- Genre: Traditional pop; big band; jazz
- Composer: Vincent Rose
- Lyricists: Larry Stock; Al Lewis

"Blueberry Hill" is a popular American song published in 1940 and first recorded and released by Sammy Kaye in 1940 on RCA Victor. It is best remembered for its 1950s rock and roll version by Fats Domino.

Glenn Miller peaked at no. 2 on the Billboard pop singles chart in 1940 with his recording on RCA Bluebird Records featuring Ray Eberle on vocals.

In 1941, Gene Autry made a recording of this song for Regal Zonophone. He also sang it in the 1941 movie The Singing Hill.

== Background ==
The music for "Blueberry Hill" was composed by Vincent Rose with lyrics written by Larry Stock and Al Lewis. The song was turned down by another publisher until being bought and published in 1940 by Chappell & Company. The song was recorded over ten times that year.

== Recordings ==
Sammy Kaye recorded and released the first recording of the song, on RCA Victor Records with vocals by Tommy Ryan on May 31, 1940, 13 days before Miller's version.

1940 Glenn Miller release on Bluebird Records.

The most successful version in 1940 was by the Glenn Miller Orchestra, which reached number 2 on the US charts featuring Ray Eberle on vocals. It was recorded in Chicago on June 13, 1940 and released on RCA Bluebird Records as catalog number B-10768-A. It was released by the His Master's Voice in the UK as catalog numbers BD 5632 and MH 92.

Louis Armstrong's 1949 recording on Decca Records with Gordon Jenkins charted in the Billboard Top 40, reaching number 29. This recording would inspire Fats Domino to create the later cover in 1956.

Elvis Presley recorded the song on January 19, 1957; the recording appeared on his 1957 EP Just for You and the Loving You LP, and a live medley of "Blueberry Hill" and "I Can't Stop Loving You" was included on his 1974 LP Elvis Recorded Live on Stage in Memphis. Little Richard recorded "Blueberry Hill" on his 1964 Little Richard Is Back (And There's a Whole Lotta Shakin' Goin' On!). Presley's fellow Sun Records alumnus Jerry Lee Lewis recorded "Blueberry Hill" in September 1973 for his LP Southern Roots: Back Home to Memphis.

Australian rock band the Loved Ones recorded "Blueberry Hill" as the lead track for their debut EP in 1966, and their recording of the song reached number 10 according to Kent Music Report, and number 11 on the Go-Set chart in February 1967.

== Fats Domino version ==
"Blueberry Hill"

Single by Fats Domino

from the album This Is Fats Domino!
- B-side: "Honey Chile"
- Released: 1956
- Genre: Rock and roll; rhythm and blues
- Length: 2:14
- Label: Imperial
- Composer: Vincent Rose
- Lyricists: Larry Stock; Al Lewis

Fats Domino singles chronology
"When My Dreamboat Comes Home" (1956)	"Blueberry Hill" (1956)	"The Rooster Song" (1957)

"Blueberry Hill" was an international hit in 1956 for Fats Domino and has become a rock and roll standard. It reached number two for three weeks on the Billboard Top 40 charts, becoming his biggest pop hit, and spent eight non-consecutive weeks at number one on the R&B Best Sellers chart. The version by Fats Domino was also ranked number 82 in Rolling Stone magazine's list of the 500 Greatest Songs of All Time.

=== Certifications ===
Region	Certification	Certified units/sales
New Zealand (RMNZ)	Gold	15,000^{‡}
^{‡} Sales+streaming figures based on certification alone.

== Popular culture ==
Vladimir Putin, then-Prime Minister of Russia, playing and then singing Blueberry Hill at a charity concert

- On The Rolling Stones concert film Charlie Is My Darling, Mick Jagger and Keith Richards perform the song impromptu during the tour of Ireland in 1965.
- On the American television show, Happy Days, Blueberry Hill is character Richie Cunningham's favorite song.
- Joe Edwards' restaurant Blueberry Hill, on the Delmar Loop in St. Louis, Missouri, where Chuck Berry frequently played, is named after the song.
- In the film 12 Monkeys, the character played by Bruce Willis belongs to a time in the future in which a deadly virus has destroyed most of mankind and forced survivors into underground bunkers. He travels back in time to 1996 on a mission to find how the virus was released, and cries tears of joy when he hears Blueberry Hill playing on the radio, thinking of how simple and beautiful life used to be.
- In the children's novel I Survived Hurricane Katrina, 2005, the song (more specifically the Fats Domino version) is the favorite song of character Barry Tucker, and becomes a major plot point during the story's climax.
- On December 10, 2010, Prime Minister of Russia Vladimir Putin made a cover performance of the song before an audience of international film and television celebrities, in support of a charity for ill children. Videos of his performance went viral worldwide.
