= Abner Silver =

American songwriter (1899–1966)

- Abner Silver c. 1935

Background information
- Born: Abner Silberman; December 28, 1899
- Origin: New York City, United States
- Died: November 24, 1966 (aged 66) New York, United States
- Occupation: Composer

Abner Silberman (28 December 1899 in New York City, New York, United States – 24 November 1966) as pen name Abner Silver, was an American songwriter who worked primarily during the Tin Pan Alley era of the craft.

== Career ==
Usually composing the music while others handled the lyrics, Silver wrote for half a century, starting with World War I–era songs such as 1918's "You Can't Blame the Girlies (They All Want to Marry a Soldier)," and continuing through the decades with such classics as 1921's "I'm Going South", 1935's "Chasing Shadows" and 1940's "How Did He Look?" Silver frequently teamed with lyricists Benny Davis, Al Sherman and Al Lewis. Between 1931 and 1934, during the last days of Vaudeville, Silver and several of his fellow hitmakers formed a sensational revue called "Songwriters on Parade", performing all across the Eastern seaboard on the Loew's and Keith circuits.

Silver's songs were covered by virtually every major vocalist of the day, among them Al Jolson, Ruth Etting, Jack Leonard, Mildred Bailey, Eddie Cantor, Rudy Vallee, Helen Kane, Kate Smith, Billie Holiday, Frank Sinatra, Tony Bennett, Mel Tormé, Eddie Fisher, Peggy Lee and Julie London. In a later era his songs were sung by Elvis Presley, Frankie Lymon, Etta Jones, Johnny Mathis, Brenda Lee and Dame Shirley Bassey. Numerous performers covered what became a country standard, "My Window Is Facing South," including Willie Nelson, Vassar Clements, Commander Cody and Lyle Lovett. Among band leaders who performed tunes composed by Silver were: Shep Fields, Django Reinhardt, Louis Prima, Lionel Hampton and Les McCann.

In the late 1950s he penned several numbers for Elvis Presley to perform in his movies, including the songs "Young and Beautiful," "What's She Really Like?" and "Lover Doll." Sung by Tom Jones, Silver's "With These Hands" (with lyrics by Benny Davis) was featured in the movie Edward Scissorhands, starring Johnny Depp. His early song "He's So Unusual" was covered by Cyndi Lauper on her breakout album, the similarly titled She's So Unusual.

Silver died on November 24, 1966, in New York.

== Partial list of songwriting credits ==
External audio
- You may hear Abner Silver's song "An Old Curiosity Shop" played by Shep Fields with Hal Derwin and John Serry in 1938 Here

- 1921 for the Broadway show Bombo, starring Al Jolson, "I'm Going South", with composer Harry M. Woods.
- 1927 "Barbara" with Billy Rose
- 1928 "Mary Ann", with Benny Davis
- 1929 "Bashful Baby" with Cliff Friend
- 1929 "Good Morning, Good Evening, Good Night" with Al Sherman and Al Lewis
- 1932 "Puh-leeze, Mr. Hemingway" with Walter Kent and Milton Drake
- 1934 "The Santa Claus Express" with Al Sherman and Al Lewis
- 1935 "Chasing Shadows" with Benny Davis
- 1935 "Every Now and Then" with Al Sherman and Al Lewis
- 1935 "No! No! A Thousand Times No!! with Al Sherman and Al Lewis
- 1935 "On the Beach at Bali-Bali" with Al Sherman and Jack Maskill
- 1938 "An Old Curiosity Shop" with Sam Coslow & Guy Wood as recorded by Shep Fields.
- 1940 "How Did He Look?" with Gladys Shelley
- 1950 "With These Hands" with Benny Davis
- 1956 "Who Can Explain?"
