= Sam Coslow =

American songwriter, singer, film producer, publisher, and market analyst

- Sam Coslow c. 1930

Background information
- Born: December 27, 1902; New York City, U.S.
- Died: April 2, 1982 (aged 79) Bronxville, New York, U.S.
- Occupations: Composer, film producer
- Formerly of: Arthur Johnston, Al Sherman

Sam Coslow (December 27, 1902 – April 2, 1982) was an American songwriter, singer, film producer, publisher and market analyst. Coslow was born in New York City. He began writing songs as a teenager. He contributed songs to Broadway revues, formed the music publishing company Spier and Coslow with Larry Spier and made a number of recordings as a performer.

== Career ==
With the explosion of film musicals in the late 1920s, Hollywood attracted a number of ambitious young songwriters, and Coslow joined them in 1929. Coslow and his partner Larry Spier sold their publishing business to Paramount Pictures and Coslow became a Paramount songwriter. One of his first assignments for the studio was the score for the 1930 film The Virtuous Sin. He formed a successful partnership with composer Arthur Johnston and together they provided the scores for a number of films including Bing Crosby vehicles.

Coslow became a film producer in the 1940s and won the Academy Award for Best Short Film for his production Heavenly Music in 1943. He was married to actress Esther Muir from 1934 to 1948, and they had a daughter, Jacqueline Coslow, who also worked as an actress. In 1953 he married cabaret singer, Frances King, of Cafe Societie duo Noble & King. Sam and Frances remained married until his death in 1982. Together they had a daughter, Cara Coslow, who gained notoriety as Head of Casting for Carsey Werner Productions and the Producer of the television series Dante's Cove. Cara Coslow is also an author of two books.

During the 1960s Coslow's work shifted from music and film to market analysis. During this time Coslow founded the publishing company Investor's Press, which published investing books and the newsletter "Indicator Digest." During the 1970s Coslow wrote two books, "Cocktails for Two" which focused on his musical career and "Super Yields" which focused on investing. He died in Bronxville in 1982, aged 79.

== Partial song list ==
External audio
- You may hear Sam Coslow's song "An Old Curiosity Shop" played by Shep Fields with Hal Derwin and John Serry in 1938 Here

- "An Old Curiosity Shop" (with Abner Silver & Guy Wood). A 1938 song recorded by Shep Fields.
- "Bebe" (music by Abner Silver). A 1923 song inspired by film actress Bebe Daniels.
- "Beware My Heart" (words and music by Coslow). Introduced by Vaughn Monroe in the 1946 film Carnegie Hall.
- "Cocktails for Two" (music by Arthur Johnston). Introduced by Carl Brisson in the 1934 film Murder at the Vanities. Became a satirical hit tune by Spike Jones.
- "Daddy Won't You Please Come Home" (1929, words and music by Coslow) from the 1929 film Thunderbolt
- "The Day You Came Along" (music by Arthur Johnston). Introduced by Bing Crosby and Judith Allen in the 1933 film Too Much Harmony
- "Deedle Deedle Dum" (with Al Sherman and Irving Mills).
- "Heart Sickness Blues" (written with Peter DeRose). First published song, recorded by the Louisiana Five in 1918.
- "Hot Voodoo" (music by Ralph Rainger) and "You Little So and So" (music by Leo Robin) from the 1932 film Blonde Venus
- "(If You Can't Sing It) You'll Have to Swing It (Mr. Paganini)", strongly associated with Ella Fitzgerald.
- "I'm in Love with the Honorable Mr. So-and-So" (words and music by Coslow)
- "In the Middle of a Kiss" (1935 words and music by Coslow). From the Paramount Picture College Scandal.
- "Just One More Chance" (music by Arthur Johnston). The first major success for Crosby as a solo recording artist.
- "Kiss and Run". (1950 words and music by Coslow). Performed as a duet by Sonny Rollins and Clifford Brown
- "Learn to Croon" (music by Arthur Johnston). Introduced by Crosby in the 1933 film College Humor
- "My Old Flame" (music by Arthur Johnston). Introduced by Mae West with Duke Ellington and His Orchestra in the 1934 film Belle of the Nineties
- "Sing, You Sinners" (music by W. Franke Harling). Introduced by Lillian Roth in the 1930 film Honey
- "Thanks" (music by Arthur Johnston). Introduced by Crosby and Judith Allen in the 1933 film Too Much Harmony
- "Tomorrow Night" (1939, with Wilhelm Grosz). Later covered by Elvis and many others.
- "True Blue Lou" (music by Richard Whiting) from the 1929 film The Dance of Life
- "Wanita" (music by Al Sherman). A 1923 song made popular by Jazz Age icon, Al Jolson.
- "(Up on Top of a Rainbow) Sweepin' the Clouds Away" (1930 words and music by Coslow). Performed in the 1930 Paramount Picture Paramount on Parade. Popularized by Maurice Chevalier, it also was used as one of the themes of the 1969 documentary The Sorrow and the Pity.
- "Five Little Miles from San Berdoo" (1951 words and music by Coslow). Performed by Jane Russell in the 1951 RKO Pictures film His Kind of Woman. Studio version recorded by Jane Russell released in 1977 by Prestige Elite Records.

== Filmography ==
- Close Shave (1942), musical short with Aurora Greeley and Leroy Broomfield and chorus girls dancing in an R.G.M. Productions film

== Bibliography ==
- Super Yields: How to Get the Highest Possible Returns on your Savings and Investments (1975)
- Cocktails for Two: The Many Lives of Giant Songwriter Sam Coslow (1977)
