= Sing, You Sinners (song) =

1930 song by Sam Coslow and W. Franke Harling

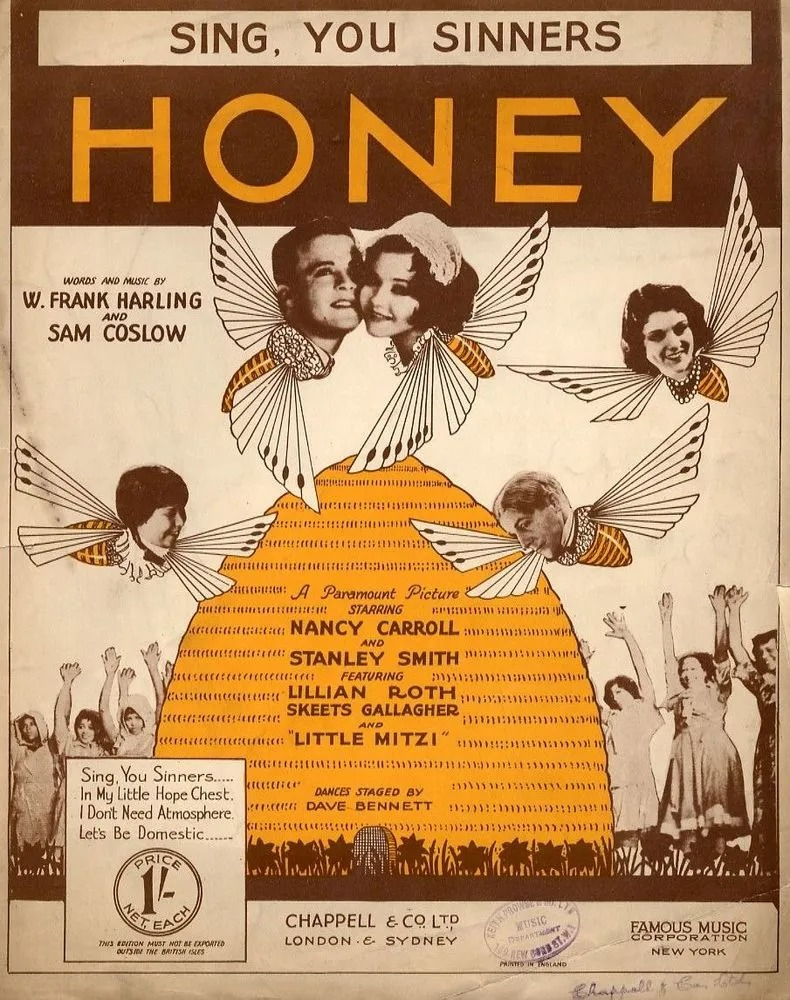
- 1930 sheet music cover with Nancy Carroll, Stanley Smith, Lillian Roth Richard "Skeets" Gallagher and Mitzi Green (as "Little Mitzi") as Honey bees with a giant beehive behind them.

Song
- Published: 1930
- Released: March 29, 1930
- Genre: Jazz; novelty song
- Songwriters: Sam Coslow; W. Franke Harling

"Sing, You Sinners" is a novelty song with music by W. Franke Harling and lyrics by Sam Coslow. Composed in 1930 for the film Honey, starring Nancy Carroll, it is performed during a musical scene by Tess Gardella, Mitzi Green (Doris) and Lillian Roth (Cora Falkner). The Bing Crosby 1938 Paramount musical Sing You Sinners also included the song in the title credits. It is considered "Coslow's biggest movie hit".

The chorus is as follows:

You sinners drop everything,
Let that harmony ring,
Up to Heaven and sing,
Sing, you sinners.

Just wave your arms all about,
Let the Lord hear your shout,
pour that music right out,
Sing, you sinners.

Whenever there’s music,
The Devil kicks,
He don't allow music
By that river Styx

You're wicked and you're depraved,
And you all misbehaved,
If you wanna be saved,
Sing, you sinners.

== History ==
According to IMDb, one day, the lyricist Sam Coslow went to a religious revival with his friends, giving him the idea to compose the song with W. Franke Harling.

== 1930 recordings ==
- Popular recordings in 1930 were by The High Hatters (on Victor 22322) and by Smith Ballew and his Orchestra.
- An early recording is found on the album "The Song Hits of 1930 (Jazz Age Chronicles, Vol. 9)", and is sung by The Charleston Chasers. This is, perhaps, the way Coslow and Harling intended it to be performed.
- Belle Baker recorded the song in April 1930, shortly after "Honey" was released.
- A version was released in 1930 by Hit of the Week Records and performed by Harlem Hot Chocolates, pseudonym for Duke Ellington's band.

== Other recordings ==
- In Britain, the song was recorded by the duo Bob and Alf Pearson.
- A popular version was recorded by Tony Bennett for Columbia Records (No. CO44125) on July 20, 1950. Bennett also recorded the song on several more occasions. In addition it is featured on Tony Bennett album Duets: An American Classic when he sings it with singer John Legend.
- In 1951 Margaret Whiting performed the song with orchestra directed by Frank DeVol (Capitol 1417 78 rpm).
- Rosemary Clooney included the song on her album Swing Around Rosie (1959).
- Mel Tormé recorded for his album Comin' Home Baby! (1962).
- The song is the title track of Erin McKeown's October 24, 2006, album Sing You Sinners.

== Popular culture ==
- Max Fleischer’s cartoon "Swing You Sinners!" (1930) from the Talkartoons series is largely based on the modified version of this song, “Swing you Sinners”.
- The song was used in the 1955 film I'll Cry Tomorrow when it was sung and danced by Susan Hayward and the chorus. It is also heard in a medley montage by Susan Hayward (vocal) and Eddie Albert (piano).
