= 1930 in country music =

This is a list of notable events in country music that took place in the year 1930.

== Events ==
- December 31 – Record sales dropped 50% from 1929.

== Top Hillbilly (Country) Recordings ==
The following songs were extracted from records included in Joel Whitburn's Pop Memories 1890-1954, record sales reported on the "Discography of American Historical Recordings" website, and other sources as specified. Numerical rankings are approximate, they are only used as a frame of reference.

Rank	Artist	Title	Label	Recorded	Released	Chart Positions
1	Jimmie Rodgers	"Anniversary Yodel (Blue Yodel No. 7)"	Victor 22488	November 26, 1929	September 5, 1930	US BB 1930 #204, US #19 for 1 week, US Hillbilly 1930 #1, 77,235 sales
2	Jimmie Rodgers	"In the Jailhouse Now No. 2"	Victor 22523	July 12, 1930	October 13, 1930	US Hillbilly 1930 #2
3	McKinney's Cotton Pickers	"If I Could Be with You One Hour To-night"	Victor 38115	January 31, 1930	July 1930	US BB 1930 #11, US #1 for 2 weeks, 19 total weeks, US Hillbilly 1930 #3
4	Beverly Hill Billies	"When the Bloom is on the Sage"	Brunswick 421	January 31, 1930	May 1930	US BB 1930 #73, US #7 for 1 week, 14 total weeks, US Hillbilly 1930 #4
5	Gid Tanner and His Skillet Lickers with Riley Puckett	"Soldier's Joy"	Columbia 15538	October 29, 1929	April 1930	US Hillbilly 1930 #5
6	Carter Family	"When the World's on Fire"	Victor 40293	May 24, 1930	August 1930	US Hillbilly 1930 #6, 30,837 sales
7	Carter Family	"Worried Man Blues"	Victor 40317	May 24, 1930	September 1930	US BB 1930 #142, US #14 for 1 weeks, 3 total weeks, US Hillbilly 1930 #7, 24,373 sales
8	Jimmie Rodgers	"Any Old Time"	Victor 22488	February 21, 1929	August 1930	US Hillbilly 1930 #8, 77,235 sales
9	Jimmie Rodgers	"Frankie and Johnnie" / "Everybody Does It in Hawaii"	Victor 22143	August 10, 1929	November 22, 1929	US Hillbilly 1930 #9
10	G. B. Grayson and Henry Whitter	"Tom Dooley"	Victor 40235	September 30, 1929	May 1930	US Hillbilly 1930 #10
11	Beverly Hill Billies	""My Pretty Quadroon"	Brunswick 441	May 1, 1930	August 1930	US BB 1930 #153, US #15 for 1 week, 5 total weeks, US Hillbilly 1930 #11
12	Alex Hood and His Railroad Boys	"Corbin Slide"	Vocalion 5463	April 1, 1930	November 1930	US Hillbilly 1930 #12
13	Cannon’s Jug Stompers	"Walk Right In"	Victor 38611	October 1, 1929	September 12, 1930	US Hillbilly 1930 #13, Grammy Hall of Fame in 2007
14	Jimmie Davis	"My Dixie Sweetheart"	Victor 40302	May 19, 1930	October 3, 1930	US Hillbilly 1930 #14, 6,415 sales
15	Kentucky Ramblers	"With My Mother Dead And Gone"	Paramount 3283	September 1, 1930	October 1930	US Hillbilly 1930 #15
16	Blue Steele Orchestra	"Missouri Moon"	Victor 23501	May 13, 1930	August 1930	US Hillbilly 1930 #16, 3,955 sales
17	Floyd County Ramblers	"Sunny Tennessee"	Victor 40307	August 29, 1930	October 17, 1930	US Hillbilly 1930 #17, 3,672 sales
18	Bud Billings and Carson Robison	"Carry Me Back To the Mountains"	Victor V-40322	July 1, 1930	November 21, 1930	US Hillbilly 1930 #18, 3,584 sales
19	Carter Family	"John Hardy Was A Desperate Little Man"	Victor 40190	May 10, 1928	December 4, 1929	US Hillbilly 1930 #19
20	Jimmie Rodgers	"My Rough and Rowdy Ways / Tuck Away My Lonesome Blues"	Victor 22220	October 22, 1929	February 1930	US Hillbilly 1930 #20
21	Stuart Hamblen	"The Big Rock Candy Mountains, No. 2"	Victor 40319	June 6, 1929	November 1930	US Hillbilly 1930 #21, 3,159 sales

== Births ==
- January 7 – Jack Greene, star of the 1960s and 1970s ("There Goes My Everything") and longtime Grand Ole Opry star (died 2013).
- June 22- Roy Drusky, Grand ole opry star
- September 23 – Ray Charles, blind African-American pop singer who recorded a series of influential country music albums, starting with Modern Sounds in Country and Western Music (died 2004).
- September 28 – Tommy Collins, singer and songwriter who helped create the Bakersfield Sound (died 2000).
- November 20 – Curly Putman, songwriter (died 2016).
