= Honey (1930 film) =

1930 film

- Window card
- Directed by: Wesley Ruggles
- Screenplay by: Herman J. Mankiewicz
- Based on: Come Out of the Kitchen! by Alice Duer Miller and A.E. Thomas
- Starring: Nancy Carroll; Harry Green; Lillian Roth; Richard "Skeets" Gallagher; Stanley Smith; Mitzi Green
- Cinematography: Henry W. Gerrard
- Production company: Paramount Pictures
- Distributed by: Paramount Pictures
- Release date: March 29, 1930
- Running time: 75 minutes
- Country: United States
- Language: English

Honey (1930)

Honey is a 1930 American pre-Code comedy film directed by Wesley Ruggles and written by Herman J. Mankiewicz. It is based on the 1916 novel Come Out of the Kitchen! by Alice Duer Miller. The film stars Nancy Carroll, Harry Green, Lillian Roth, Richard "Skeets" Gallagher, Stanley Smith and Mitzi Green. The film was released on March 29, 1930, by Paramount Pictures. Several Multiple-language versions were produced at the Joinville Studios in Paris including the French Chérie.

The film is chiefly remembered today for introducing the song "Sing, You Sinners", written by W. Franke Harling (music) and Sam Coslow (lyrics), performed by Roth (Cora Falkner) along with Tess Gardella and Mitzi Green (Doris). The number was re-created for the 1955 Roth biopic I'll Cry Tomorrow, starring Susan Hayward.

As a published work from 1930, the film entered the American public domain on January 1, 2026.

== Cast ==
- Nancy Carroll as Olivia Dangerfield
- Harry Green as J. William Burnstein
- Lillian Roth as Cora Falkner
- Richard "Skeets" Gallagher as Charles Dangerfield
- Stanley Smith as Burton Crane
- Mitzi Green as Doris
- ZaSu Pitts as Mayme
- Jobyna Howland as Mrs. Falkner
- Charles Sellon as Randolph Weeks
