= Buddy Fields (songwriter) =

American songwriter (1889–1965)

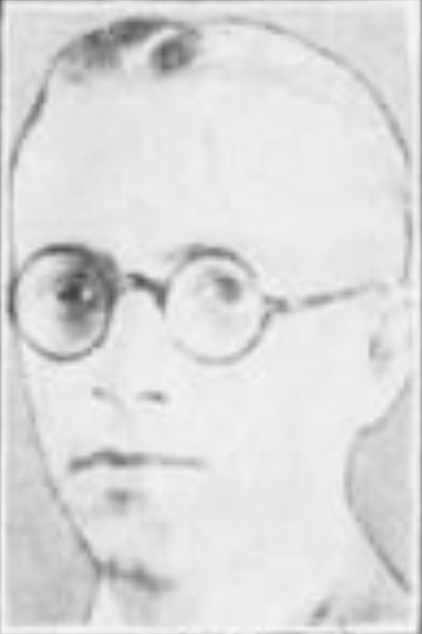
- Fields in a 1928 newspaper
- Born: September 24, 1889; Vienna, Austria-Hungary
- Died: October 4, 1965 (aged 76); Detroit, Michigan, U.S.
- Occupations: Songwriter, theatrical agent

Arthur B. "Buddy" Fields (September 24, 1889 – October 4, 1965) was an American songwriter, born in Vienna and based in Detroit. His most famous song, "You Gotta Be a Football Hero", was co-written with Al Sherman and Al Lewis.

== Biography ==
Fields was born in Vienna, and educated in Chicago public schools. During World War I, he served in the 133rd Machine Gun Battalion, 36th Division. He wrong songs as a vaudeville performer and sang on radio then became a theatrical agent in Detroit. Joining ASCAP in 1925, he collaborated musically with the likes of Al Sherman, Al Lewis, Gerald Marks, Will Collins, Howard King, Paul Ash, and Art Berman.

Fields' most famous song "You Gotta Be a Football Hero" was co-written with Al Sherman and Al Lewis. He was a member of the American Society of Composers and Publishers (ASCAP) and served on its board of directors.

Fields was married and had a daughter. He died in 1965 in Detroit, at the age of 76.

== Partial list of songwriting credits ==
- "You Gotta Be a Football Hero"
- "Falling"
- "If I Were a King in the House of David"
- "You're the One, You Beautiful Son-of-a-Gun"
- "The Night Shall Be Filled With Music"
- "With You on My Mind I Can't Write the Words"
- "By the Sign of the Rose"
- "Chinnin' and Chattin' With May"
- "The Pump Song"
- "Remember"
- "Indoor Outdoor Girl"
- "By a Camp Fire"
- "If It Wasn't for You"
- "How Can I Be Anything but Blue"
- "I'll Get Along Somehow".
