= Vincent Rose =

Italian-born American violinist, pianist, composer, and bandleader (1880–1944)

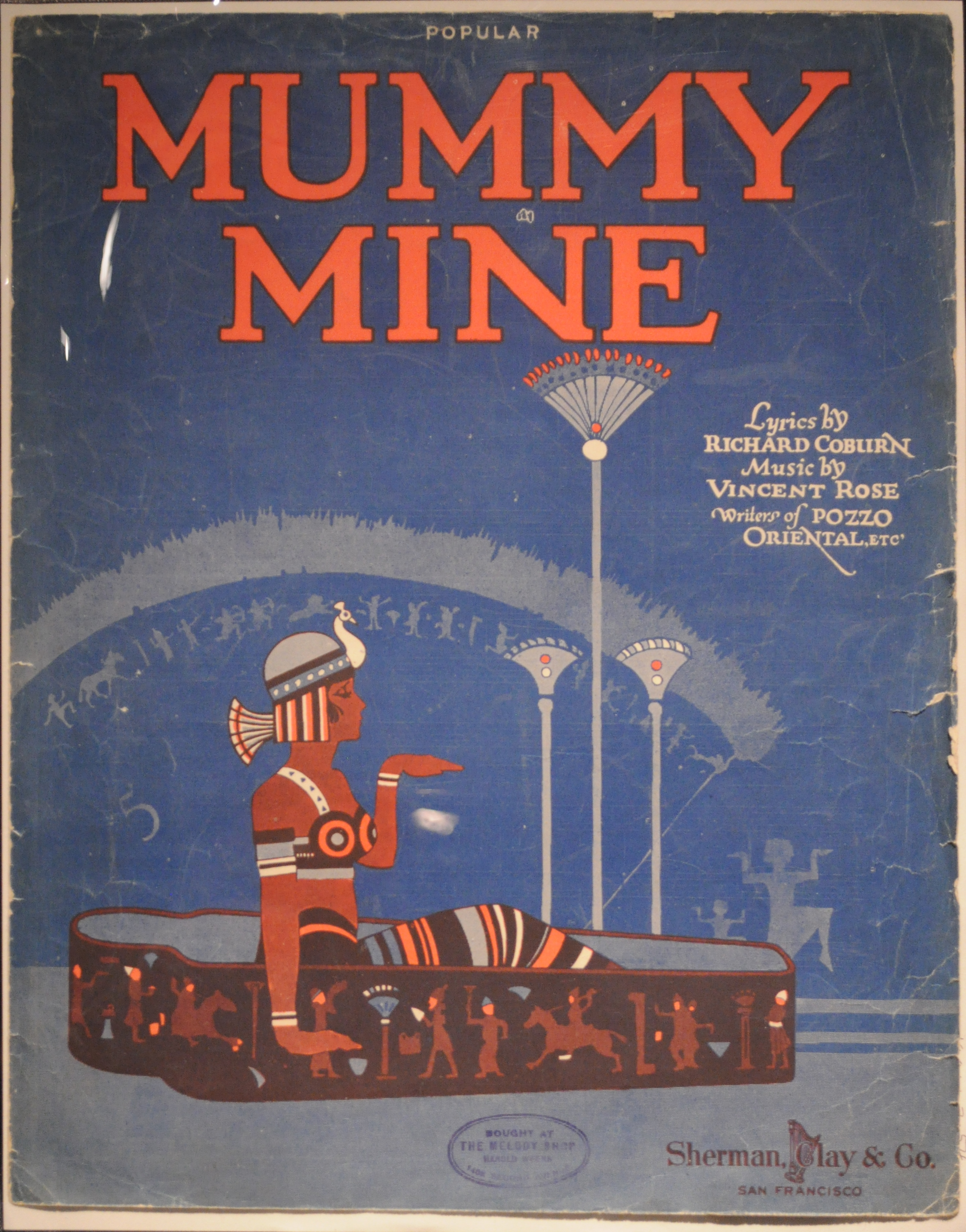
Sheet music of "Mummy Mine," a novelty song co-written by Rose and Leonard Coburn in 1918.

Vincent Rose (né Vincenzo Cacioppo; 13 June 1880 Palermo, Italy – 20 May 1944 Rockville Centre, New York) was an Italian-born American violinist, pianist, composer, and bandleader.

== Career ==
Rose holds one of the longest histories as a band leader. He achieved much popularity with his Montmartre Orchestra in the 1920s, and recorded with the group for RCA. The same personnel later recorded for the Columbia label as the Hollywood Orchestra. After leaving California, he settled in New York, but continued to record as "Vincent Rose and His Orchestra" for various labels throughout the 1930s.

Rose was a prolific songwriter, having published well over 200 songs. His hits included:

- 1920 "Whispering"
- 1921 "Avalon", with lyrics by Al Jolson and B.G. DeSylva, a big hit for Jolson.
- 1923 "Linger Awhile"
- 1940 "Blueberry Hill"

In 1921, the estate of Giovanni Ricordi and the music publishing firm he founded, Casa Ricordi — the publisher of Puccini's operas — sued all parties associated with the song, "Avalon", claiming the melody was "lifted" from the aria "E lucevan le stelle" from Puccini's opera Tosca. The court found for Puccini and his publisher, and they were awarded $25,000 in damages, plus all future print royalties earned by "Avalon". The composer and his heirs, however, continued to receive performance royalties under an agreement reached with Ricordi for payment of only $1. Such royalties amounted to a very significant amount of money during the remainder of the 20th century, far more than the $25,000 paid in damages to the publisher.

== Songwriters on Parade ==
In the late 1930s and early 1940s Rose and several of his fellow hitmakers formed a revue called Songwriters on Parade, performing all across the eastern seaboard on the Loew's and Keith circuits.

== Songwriters Hall of Fame ==
In 1970, Rose was inducted into the Songwriters Hall of Fame.
