= Tin Pan Alley =

Group of music publishers and songwriters in New York City

Coordinates: 40°44′44″N 73°59′22.5″W

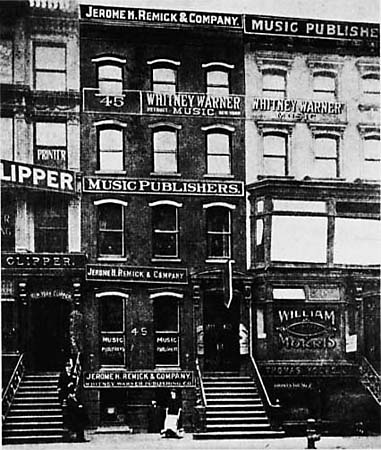
Buildings of Tin Pan Alley, 1910

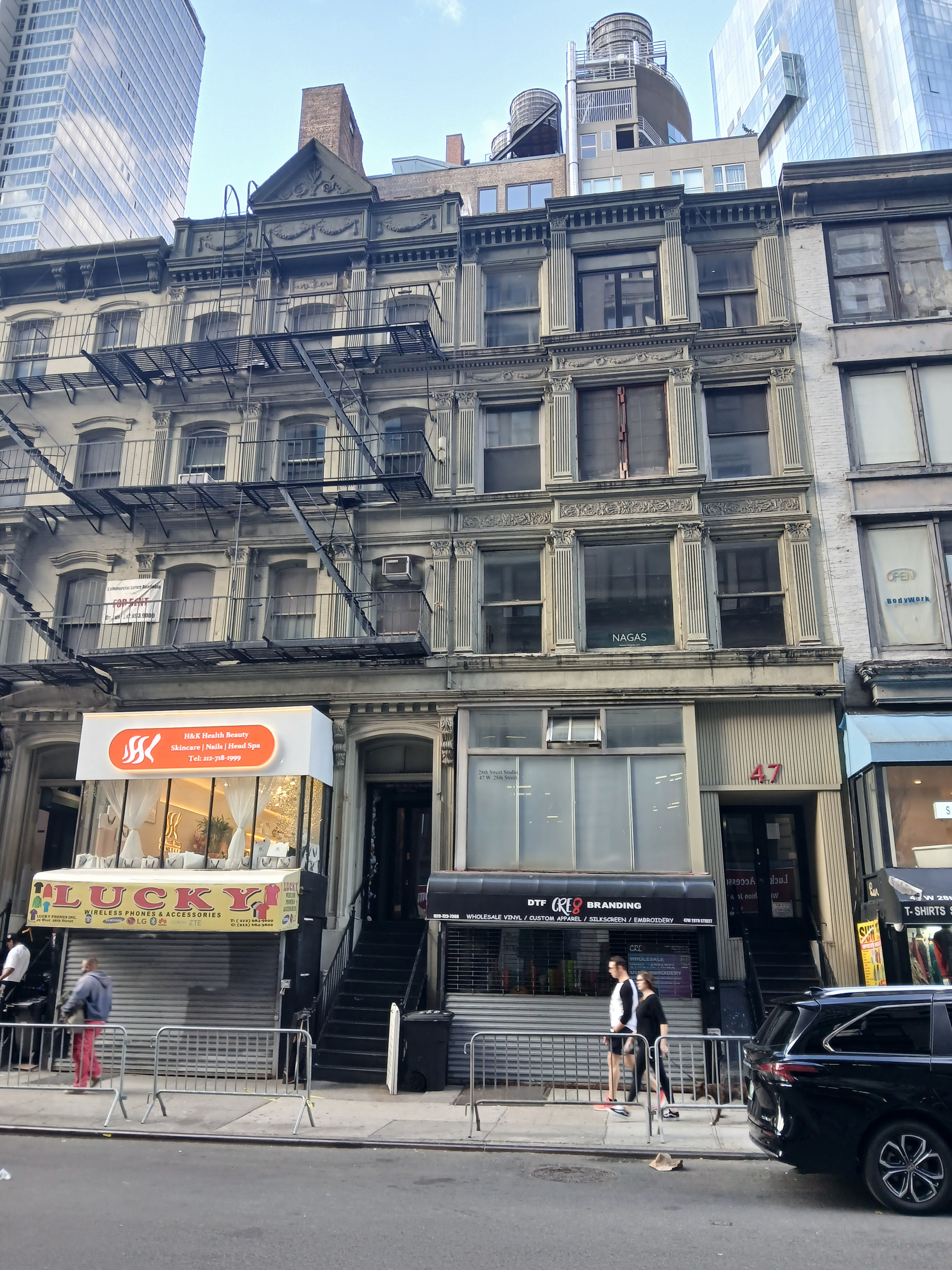
The same buildings, 2025

Tin Pan Alley was a collection of music publishers and songwriters in New York City that dominated the popular music of the United States in the late 19th and early 20th centuries. Originally, it referred to a specific location on West 28th Street, between Fifth and Sixth Avenues in the Flower District of Manhattan, as commemorated by a plaque on 28th Street between Broadway and Sixth. Several buildings on Tin Pan Alley are protected as New York City designated landmarks, and the section of 28th Street from Fifth to Sixth Avenue is also officially co-named Tin Pan Alley.

The start of Tin Pan Alley is usually dated to about 1885, when a number of music publishers set up shop in the same district of Manhattan. The end of Tin Pan Alley is less clear cut. Some date it to the start of the Great Depression in the 1930s when the phonograph, radio, and motion pictures supplanted sheet music as the driving force of American popular music, while others consider Tin Pan Alley to have continued into the 1950s when earlier styles of music were upstaged by the rise of rock and roll, which was centered on the Brill Building. Brill Building songwriter Neil Sedaka described his employer as being a natural outgrowth of Tin Pan Alley, in that the older songwriters were still employed in Tin Pan Alley firms while younger songwriters such as Sedaka found work at the Brill Building.

== Origin of the name ==
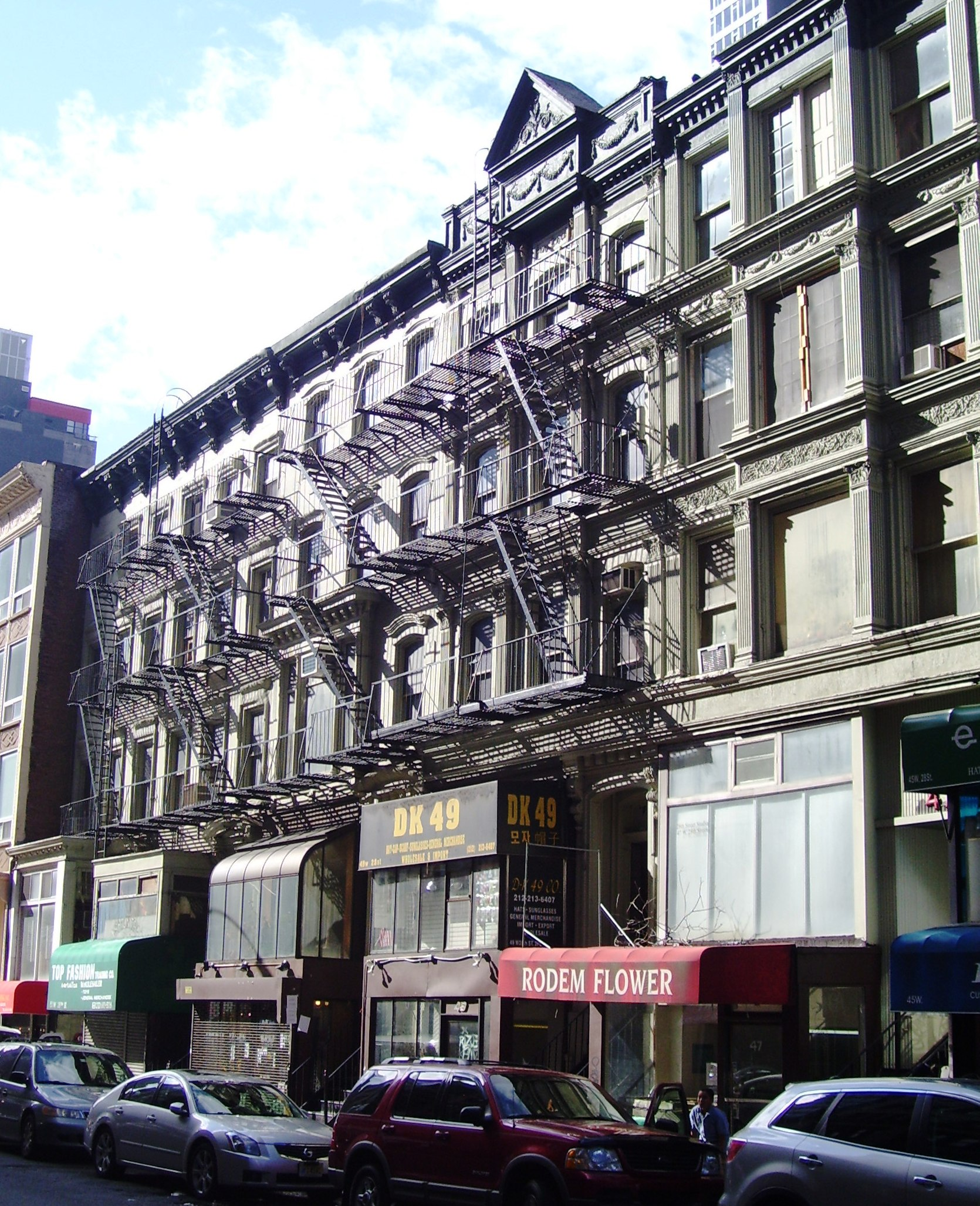
These buildings (47–55 West 28th Street) and others on West 28th Street between Sixth Avenue and Broadway in Manhattan housed the sheet-music publishers that were the center of American popular music in the early 20th century. The buildings shown were designated as historic landmarks in 2019. Taken in 2011.

There are conflicting explanations regarding the origins of the term "Tin Pan Alley". The most popular account holds that it was originally a derogatory reference made by Monroe H. Rosenfeld in the New York Herald to the collective sound made by many "cheap upright pianos" all playing different tunes being reminiscent of the banging of tin pans in an alleyway. The Grove Dictionary of American Music also cites Rosenfeld as originator of the term, dating its first use from 1903. However, while an article on Tin Pan Alley can be found in the St. Louis Post-Dispatch from May of that year, this is unattributed and no piece by Rosenfeld that employs the phrase has been discovered.

Simon Napier-Bell quotes an account of the origin of the name published in a 1930 book about the music business. In this version, popular songwriter Harry von Tilzer was being interviewed about the area around 28th Street and Fifth Avenue, where many music publishers had offices. Von Tilzer had modified his expensive Kindler & Collins piano by placing strips of paper down the strings to give the instrument a more percussive sound. The journalist told von Tilzer: "Your Kindler & Collins sounds exactly like a tin can. I'll call the article 'Tin Pan Alley'." In any case, the name was firmly attached by the fall of 1905, when The Evening World published an article titled "The Song Claque Nuisance" about 28th Street.

According to the Online Etymology Dictionary, "tin pan" was slang for "a decrepit piano" (1882), and the term came to mean a "hit song writing business" by 1907.

With time, the nickname came to describe the American music publishing industry in general. The term then spread to the United Kingdom, where "Tin Pan Alley" was also used to describe Denmark Street in London's West End. In the 1920s the street became known as "Britain's Tin Pan Alley" because of its large number of music shops.

== Origin of song publishing in New York City ==
In the mid-19th century, copyright control of melodies was not as strict, and publishers would often print their own versions of the songs popular at the time. With stronger copyright protection laws late in the century, songwriters, composers, lyricists, and publishers started working together for their mutual financial benefit.

The commercial center of the popular music publishing industry changed during the course of the 19th century, starting in Boston and moving to Philadelphia, Chicago and Cincinnati before settling in New York City under the influence of new and vigorous publishers which concentrated on vocal music. The two most enterprising New York publishers were Willis Woodard and T.B. Harms, the first companies to specialize in popular songs rather than hymns or classical music. These firms were located in the entertainment district, which, at the time, was centered on Union Square. Witmark was the first publishing house to move to West 28th Street as the entertainment district gradually shifted uptown, and by the late 1890s most publishers had followed their lead.

The biggest music houses established themselves in New York City, but small local publishers – often connected with commercial printers or music stores – continued to flourish throughout the country, and there were important regional music publishing centers in Chicago, New Orleans, St. Louis, and Boston. When a tune became a significant local hit, rights to it were usually purchased from the local publisher by one of the big New York firms.

== New York City before Tin Pan Alley ==
The American music publishing industry before Tin Pan Alley was largely based on European "art" songs in an effort to get around copyright royalty fees. American music was expensive to produce in the 19th century which meant only about 10–30% of the music printed in the United States, including New York, was written by American composers. This industry, however, laid the groundwork for the publishing industry that would be built upon to create Tin Pan Alley.

Beginning in the early 1860s, the pianist and composer J.N. Pattison (active 1862-1890) published sheet music out of a piano and organ salesroom in Union Square in downtown Manhattan. He was one of the few musicians or composers to publish his own sheet music, capitalizing on the boom in that medium as America emerged out of the Civil War, and urban middle classes grew. Piano ownership was widespread in middle-class families, and if one wanted to hear a popular new song or melody, one would buy the sheet music and then perform the piece at home.

== In its prime ==
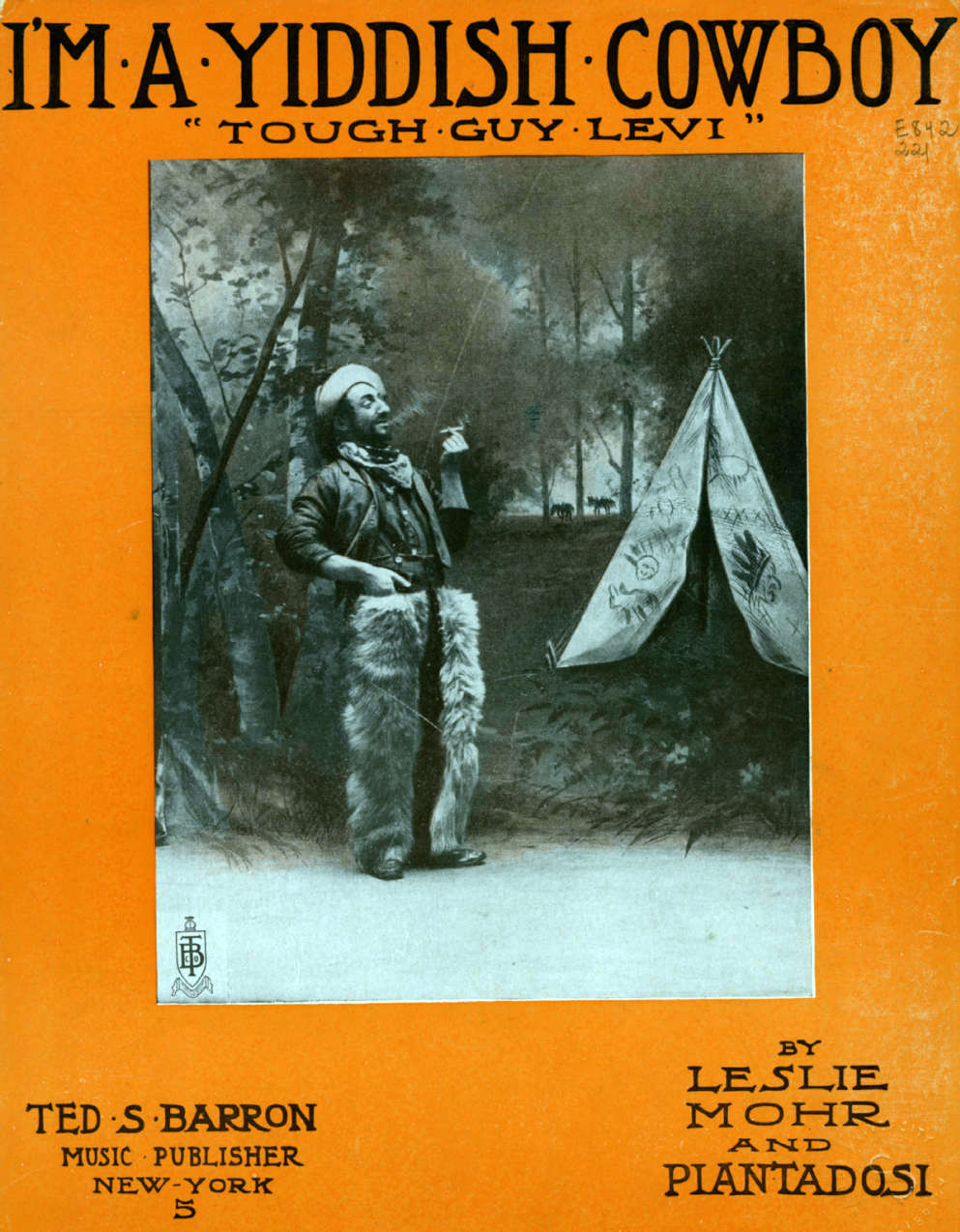
"I'm a Yiddish Cowboy" (1908)

The song publishers who created Tin Pan Alley frequently had backgrounds as salesmen. Isadore Witmark previously sold water filters and Leo Feist had sold corsets. Joe Stern and Edward B. Marks had sold neckties and buttons, respectively. The music houses in lower Manhattan were lively places, with a steady stream of songwriters, vaudeville and Broadway performers, musicians, and "song pluggers" coming and going.

Aspiring songwriters came to demonstrate tunes they hoped to sell. When tunes were purchased from unknowns with no previous hits, the name of someone with the firm was often added as co-composer (in order to keep a higher percentage of royalties within the firm), or all rights to the song were purchased outright for a flat fee (including rights to put someone else's name on the sheet music as the composer). Many Jewish immigrants became music publishers and songwriters on Tin Pan Alley. Among the songwriters who frequented Tin Pan Alley were Harold Arlen, Irving Berlin, George M. Cohan, Dorothy Fields, Scott Joplin, and Fats Waller. Songwriters who became established producers of successful songs were hired to be on the staff of the music houses.

"Song pluggers" were pianists and singers who represented the music publishers, making their living demonstrating songs to promote sales of sheet music. Most music stores had song pluggers on staff. Other pluggers were employed by the publishers to travel and familiarize the public with their new publications. Among the ranks of song pluggers were George Gershwin, Harry Warren, Vincent Youmans and Al Sherman. A more aggressive form of song plugging was known as "booming": it meant buying dozens of tickets for shows, infiltrating the audience and then singing the song to be plugged. At Shapiro, Bernstein & Co., Louis Bernstein recalled taking his plugging crew to cycle races at Madison Square Garden: "They had 20,000 people there, we had a pianist and a singer with a large horn. We'd sing a song to them thirty times a night. They'd cheer and yell, and we kept pounding away at them. When people walked out, they'd be singing the song. They couldn't help it."

When vaudeville performers played New York City, they would often visit various Tin Pan Alley firms to find new songs for their acts. Second- and third-rate performers often paid for rights to use a new song, while famous stars were given free copies of publisher's new numbers or were paid to perform them, the publishers knowing this was valuable advertising.

Initially Tin Pan Alley specialized in melodramatic ballads and comic novelty songs, but it embraced the newly popular styles of the cakewalk and ragtime music. Later, jazz and blues were incorporated, although less completely, as Tin Pan Alley was oriented towards producing songs that amateur singers or small town bands could perform from printed music. In the 1910s and 1920s Tin Pan Alley published pop songs and dance numbers created in newly popular jazz and blues styles.

Tin Pan Alley also acted as another approach to modernism. This can be seen in the use of certain influences such as, "a vernacular African-American impact coming from ragtime, 'coon' songs, the blues and jazz", as well as "input from high and middlebrow white culture". Many of these new styles were used to help fuel the economy of Tin Pan Alley, allowing composers to be more creative, as well as have a continuous influx of innovative music.

== Influence on law and business ==
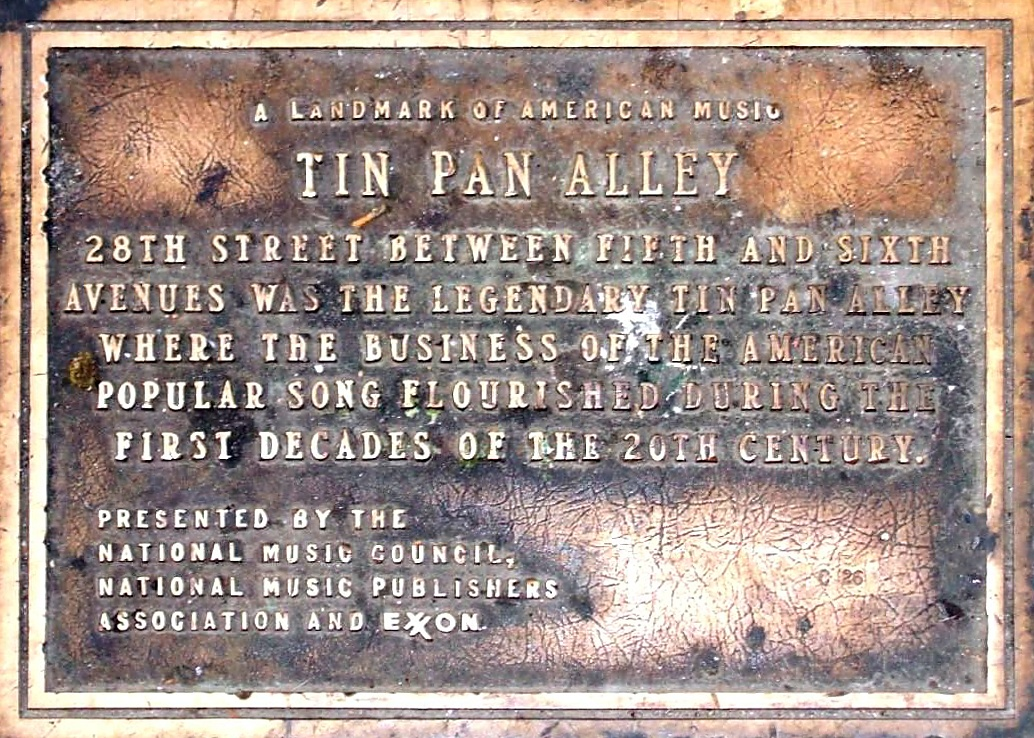
Plaque commemorating Tin Pan Alley

A group of Tin Pan Alley music houses formed the Music Publishers Association of the United States on June 11, 1895, and unsuccessfully lobbied the federal government in favor of the Treloar Copyright Bill, which would have changed the term of copyright for published music from 24 to 40 years, renewable for an additional 20 instead of 14 years. The bill, if enacted, would also have included music among the subject matter covered by the Manufacturing clause of the International Copyright Act of 1891.

The American Society of Composers, Authors, and Publishers (ASCAP) was founded in 1914 to aid and protect the interests of established publishers and composers. New members were only admitted with sponsorship of existing members.

The term and established business methodologies associated with Tin Pan Alley persisted into the 1960s when artists like Bob Dylan helped establish new norms. Referring to the dominant conventions of music publishers of the early 20th century, "Tin Pan Alley is gone", Dylan proclaimed in 1985: "I put an end to it. People can record their own songs now."

== Contributions to World War II ==
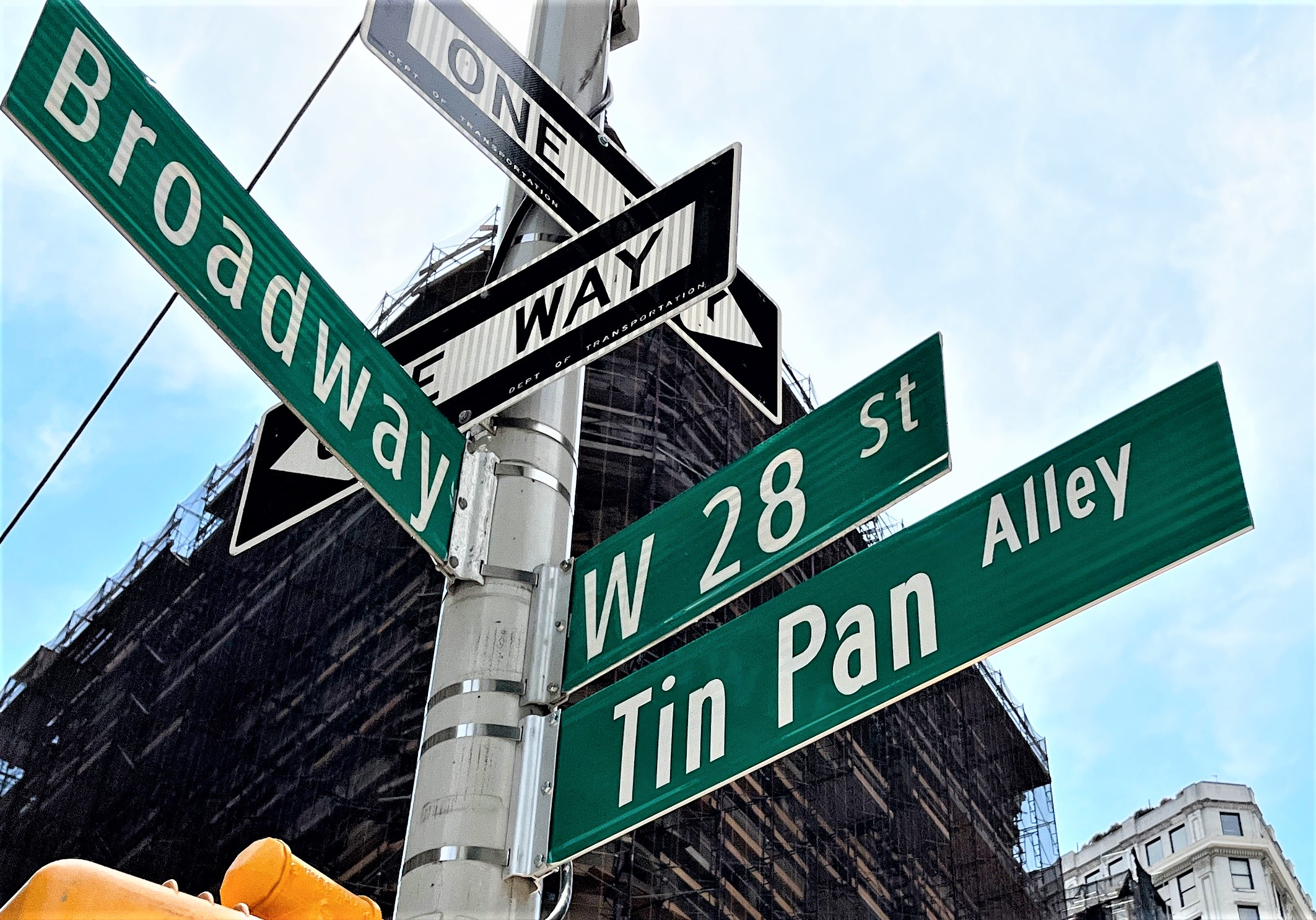
Tin Pan Alley street sign, unveiled in April 2022

During the Second World War, Tin Pan Alley and the federal government teamed up to produce a war song that would inspire the American public to support the fight against the Axis, something they both "seemed to believe ... was vital to the war effort". The Office of War Information was in charge of this project and believed that Tin Pan Alley contained "a reservoir of talent and competence capable of influencing people's feelings and opinions" that it "might be capable of even greater influence during wartime than that of George M. Cohan's 'Over There' during World War I". In the United States, the song "Over There" has been said to be the most popular and resonant patriotic song associated with World War I. Due to the large fan base of Tin Pan Alley, the government believed that this sector of the music business would be far-reaching in spreading patriotic sentiments.

In the United States Congress, congressmen quarreled over a proposal to exempt musicians and other entertainers from the draft in order to remain in the country to boost morale. Stateside, these artists and performers were continuously using available media to promote the war effort and to demonstrate a commitment to victory. However, the proposal was contested by those who strongly believed that only those who provided more substantial contributions to the war effort should benefit from draft exemption.

As the war progressed, those in charge of writing the would-be national war song began to understand that the interest of the public lay elsewhere. Since the music would take up such a large amount of airtime, it was imperative that the writing be consistent with the war message that the radio was carrying throughout the nation. In her book God Bless America: Tin Pan Alley Goes to War, Kathleen E. R. Smith writes that "escapism seemed to be a high priority for music listeners", leading "the composers of Tin Pan Alley [to struggle] to write a war song that would appeal both to civilians and the armed forces". By the end of the war, no such song had been produced that could rival hits like "Over There" from World War I.

Whether or not the number of songs circulated from Tin Pan Alley between 1939 and 1945 was greater than during the First World War is still debated. In his book The Songs That Fought the War: Popular Music and the Home Front, John Bush Jones cites Jeffrey C. Livingstone as claiming that Tin Pan Alley released more songs during World War I than it did in World War II. Jones, on the other hand, argues that "there is also strong documentary evidence that the output of American war-related songs during World War II was most probably unsurpassed in any other war".

== Composers and lyricists ==
Tin Pan Alley composers and lyricists include:

- Milton Ager
- Thomas S. Allen
- Harold Arlen
- Ernest Ball
- Harry Barris
- Irving Berlin
- Bernard Bierman
- George Botsford
- Shelton Brooks
- Lew Brown
- Nacio Herb Brown
- Jim Burris
- Irving Caesar
- Sammy Cahn
- Hoagy Carmichael
- George M. Cohan
- Con Conrad
- J. Fred Coots
- Gussie Lord Davis
- Buddy DeSylva
- Walter Donaldson
- Paul Dresser
- Dave Dreyer
- Al Dubin
- Vernon Duke
- Ida Emerson
- Dorothy Fields
- Ted Fio Rito
- Max Freedman
- Cliff Friend
- T. Mayo Geary
- George Gershwin
- Ira Gershwin
- Albert Gumble
- Oscar Hammerstein II
- E. Y. "Yip" Harburg
- Charles K. Harris
- Lorenz Hart
- Silvio Hein
- Ray Henderson
- Joseph E. Howard
- Ben Jerome
- William Jerome
- James P. Johnson
- Isham Jones
- Scott Joplin
- Gus Kahn
- Bert Kalmar
- Jerome Kern
- Ted Koehler
- Edward Laska
- Al Lewis
- Sam M. Lewis
- Frank Loesser
- Jimmy McHugh
- F. W. Meacham
- Johnny Mercer
- Halsey K. Mohr
- Billy Moll
- Theodora Morse
- Owen Murphy
- Ethelbert Nevin
- Mitchell Parish
- Bernice Petkere
- Maceo Pinkard
- Lew Pollack
- Cole Porter
- William Raskin
- J. A. Raynes
- Andy Razaf
- Richard Rodgers
- Harry Ruby
- Jean Schwartz
- Al Sherman
- Abner Silver
- Lou Singer
- Sunny Skylar
- Lee Orean Smith
- Ted Snyder
- Kay Swift
- Edward Teschemacher
- Albert Von Tilzer
- Harry Von Tilzer
- Fats Waller
- Harry Warren
- Paul West
- Richard A. Whiting
- Harry M. Woods
- Allie Wrubel
- Jack Yellen
- Vincent Youmans
- Joe Young
- Hy Zaret

== Notable hit songs ==
Tin Pan Alley's biggest hits included:

- "A Bird in a Gilded Cage" (1900) – written by Harry Von Tilzer
- "After the Ball" (1892) – written by Charles K. Harris
- "Ain't She Sweet" (1927) – written by Jack Yellen and Milton Ager
- "Alabama Jubilee" (1915) – written by Jack Yellen and George L. Cobb
- "Alexander's Ragtime Band" (1911) – written by Irving Berlin
- "All Alone" (1924) – written by Irving Berlin
- "At a Georgia Campmeeting" (1897) – written by Kerry Mills
- "Baby Face" (1926) – written by Benny Davis and Harry Akst
- "Bill Bailey, Won't You Please Come Home" (1902) – written by Huey Cannon
- "By the Light of the Silvery Moon" (1909) – written by Gus Edwards and Edward Madden
- "Carolina in the Morning" (1922) – written by Gus Kahn and Walter Donaldson
- "Come Josephine in My Flying Machine" (1910) – written by Fred Fisher and Alfred Bryan
- "Down by the Old Mill Stream" (1910) – written by Tell Taylor
- "Everybody Loves My Baby" (1924) – written by Spencer Williams
- "For Sentimental Reasons" (1936) – written by Al Sherman, Abner Silver and Edward Heyman
- "Give My Regards to Broadway" (1904) – written by George M. Cohan
- "God Bless America" (1918; revised 1938) – written by Irving Berlin
- "Happy Days Are Here Again" (1930) – written by Jack Yellen and Milton Ager
- "Hearts and Flowers" (1899) – written by Theodore Moses Tobani
- "Hello Ma Baby (Hello Ma Ragtime Gal)" (1899) – written by Emerson, Howard and Sterling
- "Honeysuckle Rose" (1929) – written by Andy Razaf and Thomas "Fats" Waller
- "I Cried for You" (1923) – written by Arthur Freed and Nacio Herb Brown
- "I'm Forever Blowing Bubbles" (1919) – written by John Kellette
- "In the Baggage Coach Ahead" (1896) – written by Gussie L. Davis
- "In the Good Old Summer Time" (1902) – written by Ren Shields and George Evans
- "In the Shade of the Old Apple Tree" (1905) – written by Harry Williams and Egbert van Alstyne
- "K-K-K-Katy" (1918) – written by Geoffrey O'Hara
- "Let Me Call You Sweetheart" (1910) – written by Beth Slater Whitson and Leo Friedman
- "Lindbergh (The Eagle of the U.S.A.)" (1927) – written by Al Sherman and Howard Johnson
- "Lovesick Blues" (1922) – written by Cliff Friend and Irving Mills
- "Mighty Lak' a Rose" (1901) – written by Ethelbert Nevin and Frank L. Stanton
- "Mister Johnson, Turn Me Loose" (1896) – written by Ben Harney
- "My Blue Heaven" (1927) – written by Walter Donaldson and George Whiting
- "Now's the Time to Fall in Love" (1931) – written by Al Sherman and Al Lewis
- "Oh, Donna Clara" (1928) – written by Irving Caesar
- "Oh by Jingo!" (1919) – written by Albert Von Tilzer
- "On the Banks of the Wabash, Far Away" (1897) – written by Paul Dresser
- "Over There" (1917) – written by George M. Cohan
- "Peg o' My Heart" (1913) – written by Fred Fisher and Alfred Bryan
- "Shine Little Glow Worm" (1907) – written by Paul Lincke and Lilla Cayley Robinson
- "Shine on Harvest Moon" (1908) – written by Nora Bayes and Jack Norworth
- "Some of These Days" (1911) – written by Shelton Brooks
- "Stardust" (1927) – written by Hoagy Carmichael and Mitchell Parish
- "Swanee" (1919) – written by George Gershwin
- "Sweet Georgia Brown" (1925) – written by Maceo Pinkard
- "Take Me Out to the Ball Game" (1908) – written by Albert Von Tilzer
- "The Band Played On" (1895) – written by Charles B. Ward and John F. Palmer
- "The Darktown Strutters' Ball" (1917) – written by Shelton Brooks
- "The Little Lost Child" (1894) – written by Marks and Stern
- "The Man Who Broke the Bank at Monte Carlo" (1892) – written by Charles Coborn
- "The Sidewalks of New York" (1894) – written by Lawlor and Blake
- "The Japanese Sandman" (1920) – written by Richard A. Whiting and Raymond B. Egan
- "There'll Be a Hot Time in the Old Town Tonight" (1896) – written by Joe Hayden and Theodore Mertz
- "Warmest Baby in the Bunch" (1896) – written by George M. Cohan
- "Way Down Yonder in New Orleans" (1922) – written by Creamer and Turner Layton
- "When You Wore a Tulip and I Wore a Big Red Rose" (1914) - written by Jack Mahoney and Percy Wenrich
- "Whispering" (1920) – written by Malvin Schonberger and John Schonberger
- "Yes, We Have No Bananas" (1923) – written by Frank Silver and Irving Cohn
- "You Gotta Be a Football Hero" (1933) – written by Al Sherman, Buddy Fields and Al Lewis

== Impact ==
=== Landmark designation and co-naming ===
In 2019, the New York City Landmarks Preservation Commission took up the question of preserving five buildings on the north side of the street as a Tin Pan Alley Historic District. The agency designated five buildings (47–55 West 28th Street) individual landmarks on December 10, 2019, after a concerted effort by the "Save Tin Pan Alley" initiative of the 29th Street Neighborhood Association. Following successful protection of these landmarks, project director George Calderaro and other proponents formed the Tin Pan Alley American Popular Music Project.

On April 2, 2022, 28th Street between Broadway and 6th Avenue was officially co-named "Tin Pan Alley" by the City of New York.

=== In popular culture ===
- The Bob Geddins blues song "Tin Pan Alley (AKA The Roughest Place in Town)", recorded by Jimmy Wilson, was a top 10 hit on the R&B chart in 1953 and became a popular song among West Coast blues performers. The song was a favourite of, and covered many times, by Stevie Ray Vaughan.
- In the 1970s to early 1980s, a Times Square bar named Tin Pan Alley, its owners, Steve d'Agroso and Maggie Smith, and many of its patrons were the real-life inspiration for the HBO series The Deuce. The bar was renamed The Hi-Hat in the series.
- The BBC television music series, Old Grey Whistle Test derived its name from a Tin Pan Alley phrase. Upon receiving the first pressing of a record they would play it to people they called "the old greys" – doormen in grey suits. If the doormen could remember and whistle the song after one listen, it had passed the old grey whistle test.
- The song "Who Are You" by The Who has the stanza "I stretched back and I hiccupped / And looked back on my busy day / Eleven hours in the Tin Pan / God, there's got to be another way", which references a long legal meeting with music publisher Allen Klein.
- The last lines in the Dire Straits song "It Never Rains" on the album Love Over Gold, refers to a woman in the entertainment industry being taken advantage of in 'Vaudeville Valley' and Tin Pan Alley.

== See also ==
- Music Row – Historical district in Nashville, Tennessee
- Printer's Alley – Alley in Nashville, Tennessee, US
- Radio Row – Urban area with a large number of businesses selling radio equipment
- The Tin Pan Alley Rag – Musical written by Mark Saltzman
- Great American Songbook – Canon of American jazz standards, popular songs and show tunes
