= Ninety-Nine Out of a Hundred =

1930s popular song

"Ninety-Nine Out of a Hundred" is a popular song from the 1930s, written by Harry Warren and Al Dubin. The song was first introduced by the American singer and bandleader Rudy Vallée in 1932, and went on to become a hit. The song is a romantic ballad, with lyrics that express the idea that "ninety-nine out of a hundred times" love affairs are doomed to fail. Vallée's smooth, crooning vocals, backed by his band's lush orchestration, captured the sentiment of the era, when the Great Depression was still gripping the United States and many people were looking for solace in sentimental music. The song's popularity helped to cement Vallée's status as one of the leading entertainers of the time, and he went on to perform it in numerous films and on radio and television shows. The song has been covered by many other artists over the years, including Bing Crosby, Doris Day, and Dean Martin.

Despite its melancholy message, "Ninety-Nine Out of a Hundred" remains a beloved classic of American popular music, with its memorable melody and poignant lyrics touching the hearts of generations of listeners.
