= Hal Derwin =

American dance bandleader

Hal Derwin or Hal Derwyn (July 14, 1914 – February 9, 1998) was an American dance bandleader, principally active in the 1940s.

Early in his career, Derwin was a member of a vocal trio with Lee Gillette (later a talent scout for Capitol Records). In the 1930s, he worked with musicians such as Boyd Raeburn, Louis Panico, Shep Fields, and Les Brown, and formed his own band in Chicago in 1940 that included Freddy Large (of Jan Garber's band) as a sideman. He toured the Midwest for much of the 1940s, and had several 10-inch singles released on Capitol Records after World War II, including the hit song "The Old Lamp-Lighter", which reached number six on the Billboard chart. In the early 1950s, his band took up a residency at the Biltmore Bowl in Los Angeles for six years and was broadcast on NBC Radio. Derwin continued to record and perform on the side, including with Artie Shaw and in a duet with Martha Tilton. Later in his career, he worked in artist and repertory for Capitol.
