= Al Sherman =

American songwriter (1897–1973)

- Sherman in 1948.

Background information
- Also known as: Albert Sherman
- Born: Avrum Sherman; September 7, 1897; Kyiv, Russian Empire, now Ukraine
- Died: September 16, 1973 (aged 76) Los Angeles, California, United States
- Genres: Tin Pan Alley
- Occupation(s): Songwriter, composer
- Years active: 1916–1973

Avrum Sherman (September 7, 1897 – September 16, 1973), pen name Al Sherman, was an American songwriter and composer active during the Tin Pan Alley era in American music history. Some of his most recognizable song titles include "You Gotta Be a Football Hero", "Now's the Time to Fall in Love" and "Lindbergh (The Eagle of the U.S.A.)". Sherman is one link in a long chain of family members who were musical. Most notably, his sons Robert and Richard (referred to popularly as the Sherman Brothers) were to join the ranks of America's most highly regarded songwriters. Pairing up and mentoring the Sherman Brothers team has often been referred to as Al Sherman's greatest songwriting achievement.

== Early life ==
Al Sherman was born into a musical Jewish family in Kyiv, Russian Empire. His father, violinist Samuel Sherman, fled a Cossack pogrom in 1903. Samuel settled in Prague which was at that time part of the Austro-Hungarian Empire. He eventually found success working as a concertmaster, first violinist and intermittent court composer in the Royal Court of Emperor Franz Josef. Within a year or so of his arrival, Samuel's family came to live with him in Prague.

As a young boy, Al attended concerts in the royal court. He hid in the gallery wings while his father performed for the Emperor. Sherman would later remark that it was these moments which originally incited his interest in music. In 1909 the Samuel Shermans relocated to New York City. In 1911, frustrated by the lack of available work, Samuel left his wife Lena and their five young children: Olga, Al, Edith, Regina, and newborn Harold. At age 13, Sherman quit school to become the family's primary breadwinner. By 16, he had taught himself to play the piano and found work in bands. Despite his parents' separation and the resulting hardships, Sherman maintained great respect for his father and remained in close contact with him until Samuel's death in 1947.

Despite youth and scant knowledge of English, his natural talent for piano improvisation soon earned him a reputation as a top "mood music" pianist. His services to improvise inspirational music were sought by many silent film stars including Pauline Frederick, Mae Murray and Olga Petrova. In 1916, Universal signed Al to do bit parts in silent films as well. He later appeared in motion pictures with Mary Pickford, Mary Fuller, Clara Kimball Young and William Powell.

Al's composing career began in 1918 when he became a staff pianist for the Remick Music Company. There, he worked alongside George Gershwin and Vincent Youmans. During this time Al also organized and directed a small orchestra which played in New York and Miami Beach. He joined the American Society of Composers, Authors and Publishers (ASCAP) in 1919.

== Personal life ==
In the summer of 1921, Al was at the piano leading his orchestra when he met a silent film actress, Rosa Dancis. They married in 1923. Al and Rosa Sherman's elder son, Robert Bernard Sherman, was born on December 19, 1925. Their younger son Richard Morton Sherman was born on June 12, 1928. Both boys were born in New York City. As the Sherman Brothers, they proved to be Al's greatest songwriting achievement, forming one of the most formidable songwriting teams in family entertainment (Mary Poppins, Chitty Chitty Bang Bang, Bedknobs and Broomsticks).

== Career ==
In the 1920s, 1930s and 1940s, Al collaborated with songwriters including Sam Coslow, Irving Mills, Charles O'Flynn, Al Dubin, B.G. deSylva, Harold Tobias, Howard Johnson, Harry M. Woods, Alfred Bryan, Buddy Fields, Archie Fletcher, Al Lewis, Abner Silver, Edward Heyman, Buddy Feyne, among many others.

Sherman quickly rose to become one of Tin Pan Alley's most sought after songwriters. Between 1931 and 1934, during the last days of vaudeville, he and several of his fellow hitmakers formed a sensational review, Songwriters on Parade, performing all across the Eastern seaboard on the Loew's and Keith circuits. Some of Al Sherman's most well known songs also include: "Wanita", "Save Your Sorrow", "Lindbergh (The Eagle of the U.S.A.)", "Pretending", "On the Beach at Bali-Bali", "Over Somebody Else's Shoulder", "No! No! A Thousand Times No!!", "For Sentimental Reasons", "(What Do We Do on a) Dew Dew Dewey Day", "Nine Little Miles from Ten-Ten-Tennessee" and "Ninety-Nine Out of a Hundred (Wanna Be Loved)". Maurice Chevalier's American breakthrough hit was an Al Sherman/Al Lewis song entitled "Livin' in the Sunlight, Lovin' in the Moonlight" from the Paramount Picture The Big Pond. "You Gotta Be a Football Hero" has been played, sung and marched to since 1933 when Fred Waring and his "Pennsylvanians" introduced it on the radio. The Sherman/Fletcher song "On a Little Bamboo Bridge" became a hit for Louis Armstrong.

Some of his most memorable songs include songs for major Broadway revues, including the Ziegfeld Follies, George White's Scandals, The Passing Show and Earl Carroll's Vanities. Beside writing "Livin' in the Sunlight" for The Big Pond, Al also wrote for many other films including songs for the motion pictures Sweetie, The Sky's the Limit and Sensations of 1945. Sherman's style and settings are suggested by such song titles as "Got the Bench, Got the Park", "Woodland Reverie", "Never a Dream Goes By" and "When You Waltz with the One You Love". Although he would continue to write songs and musical compositions until his death, he wrote his last big song in 1952, "Comes A-Long A-Love", which was sung by Kay Starr.

== Last years ==
In 1973 the Associated Press wrote, "Al Sherman helped raise the spirits of a Depression-era generation with his hit 'Now's the Time to Fall in Love'. Al wrote more than five hundred songs but gained his greatest fame for that happy tune." As Al was always capable of finding the "silver lining", "Potatoes Are Cheaper" became his signature song. In 1973 he titled his autobiography Potatoes Are Cheaper.

Al Sherman died in Los Angeles, California, on September 16, 1973, at the age of 76.

== Posthumous achievements ==
In 1983, Sherman's song, "He's So Unusual", was chosen as the title song of Cyndi Lauper's signature album, She's So Unusual. She's So Unusual catapulted Lauper to stardom with such hits as "Girls Just Want To Have Fun", "She Bop" and "Time After Time". Lauper's rendition of "He's So Unusual" was a clear homage to the original 1920s production, even going so far as to feature scratches and hisses on the track, making it sound even more like the original 78 record. She's So Unusual won its sole Grammy Award in the category of Best Album Package, the concept of which clearly was founded on the title of the Sherman's song. As of 2002 She's So Unusual has sold more than 16 million copies worldwide. The album peaked at #4 on the Billboard pop albums chart (US). In 2003, the album was ranked number 494 on Rolling Stone magazine's list of 500 Greatest Albums of All Time. In 2013, the album was ranked number 63 on Rolling Stone magazine's list of the 100 Greatest Debut Albums of All Time.

Alongside his sons Robert and Richard, Al Sherman became the subject of a London musical concert, A Spoonful of Sherman, narrated by Sherman's grandson, Robert J. Sherman. A double CD of A Spoonful of Sherman was released by SimG Records in 2015. A Spoonful of Sherman was revived twice in London, once in 2014 and then in 2017, and then completely reworked once again as a musical stage show revue in 2018 touring the UK and Ireland.

== See also ==
- Category:Songs written by Al Sherman
