= Walt's Time =

Autobiographical book by Robert B. Sherman and Richard M. Sherman

Walt's Time: From Before to Beyond
- Editor: Bruce Gordon, David Mumford, Jeff Kurtti
- Author: Robert B. Sherman, Richard M. Sherman
- Genre: Autobiography
- Publisher: Camphor Tree Publishers
- Publication date: 1998
- Pages: 252

Walt's Time: From Before to Beyond is a 252-page autobiographical, full-color book by Robert B. Sherman and Richard M. Sherman. It was edited by Disney Imagineers Bruce Gordon, David Mumford and Jeff Kurtti and was published in 1998 by Camphor Tree Publishers of Santa Clarita, California. Bruce Gordon did the book design and layout.

== General outline ==
The book is divided into three major sections.

=== Section One: "Walt's Time" ===
The first section, "Walt’s Time", describes the Shermans’ years with Walt Disney at The Walt Disney Company starting with their first composition, Annette Funicello’s "Strummin’ Song", and continuing through 1967's The Jungle Book.

=== Section Two: "Al's Time" ===
The other influential person in their life, their father, Al Sherman, himself a well-known songwriter in the 1930s and '40s, is covered in the middle section, "Al's Time." This part of the book discusses Al's life from coming to America as a Russian immigrant to becoming a successful songwriter for famous musicians including Louis Armstrong, Al Jolson, Lawrence Welk and Maurice Chevalier. This section also talks about the Shermans' early days growing up in Beverly Hills, their college years, Robert's tour in World War II and their early, separate careers. The section ends where the first section starts, their first meeting with Walt Disney.

=== Section Three: "Our Time" ===
The final section of the book, “Our Time,” deals with the Shermans' life after Walt Disney and includes many more Disney projects including Winnie-the-Pooh and Epcot. This part also includes their many and varied non-Disney projects, including Chitty Chitty Bang Bang, Snoopy Come Home and Mark Twain's Tom Sawyer: A Musical Adaptation. The section concludes with their work on Disneyland's 1998 New Tomorrowland. The book also includes appendices with a song list, video list and some notes on their unpublished material. Walt's Time also includes a preface by then Walt Disney Company's vice-chairman Roy E. Disney, a foreword by the Vice Chairman of Walt Disney Imagineering Marty Sklar, and an introduction by Disney film historian Leonard Maltin. Also included are afterwords by each of the three editors as well as a thorough discography and videography.

== Publishing details ==
Walt's Time was published by Camphor Tree Publishers in December 1998 (hardcover, ISBN 0-9646059-3-7)
