= Al Lewis (lyricist) =

American lyricist (1901–1967)

- Born: Alvin Lewis; April 18, 1901; New York City, U.S.
- Died: April 4, 1967 (aged 65); New York City, U.S.
- Occupations: Lyricist; music publisher
- Organization: Vanderbilt Music

Al Lewis (April 18, 1901 – April 4, 1967) was an American lyricist, songwriter and music publisher. He is thought of mostly as a Tin Pan Alley era lyricist; however, he did write music on occasion as well. Professionally he was most active during the 1920s working into the 1950s. During this time, he most often collaborated with songwriters such as Al Sherman and Abner Silver. Among his most famous songs are "Blueberry Hill" and "You Gotta Be a Football Hero".

== Songwriters on Parade ==
Between 1931 and 1934, during the last days of Vaudeville, Lewis and several other hitmakers of the day performed in a revue called "Songwriters on Parade", performing all across the Eastern seaboard on the Loew's and Keith circuits.

== Career revival in the 1950s ==
Lewis's career received a boost in 1956 when "Blueberry Hill", a song he had co-written in the 1940s with Larry Stock, became a big hit for Fats Domino. Two years later Lewis and Sylvester Bradford, a blind African-American songwriter, wrote "Tears on My Pillow", which was a hit for Little Anthony and the Imperials.

== Hit songs ==
- 1926 "Gonna Get a Girl" composed by Howard Simon
- 1929 "He's So Unusual"
- 1929 "Good Morning, Good Evening, Good Night"
- 1930 "Livin' in the Sunlight, Lovin' in the Moonlight"
- 1931 "Got the Bench, Got the Park"
- 1933 "Now's the Time to Fall in Love", an Eddie Cantor hit vocal.
- 1933 "You Gotta Be a Football Hero"
- 1936 "Hypnotized"
- 1940 "Blueberry Hill"
- 1941 "Rose O'Day"
- 1958 "Tears on My Pillow", written with Sylvester Bradford, recorded by Little Anthony and the Imperials
- 1959 "I'm Ready" with Fats Domino & Sylvester Bradford
