= You Brought a New Kind of Love to Me =

1930 popular song

Song
- Songwriters: Sammy Fain; Irving Kahal; Pierre Norman

"You Brought a New Kind of Love to Me" is a 1930 popular song. The credits list music and lyrics as written by Sammy Fain, Irving Kahal, and Pierre Norman. Since Fain was primarily a music writer and Kahal a lyricist, it may be assumed that the music was by Fain and lyrics were by Kahal, with Norman's contribution uncertain.

The song was introduced in the movie The Big Pond (1930) by Maurice Chevalier who also made a successful recording of it the same year. Other hit recordings in 1930 were by Paul Whiteman and his Orchestra (with a vocal by Bing Crosby), and the High Hatters.

In Britain, the song was covered by Bob and Alf Pearson.

The song has been used in other movies, including Monkey Business (1931), where the Marx Brothers steal Chevalier's passport and sing this song to try to prove they are Chevalier as they attempt to pass through US Customs. The song is a well-known standard, recorded by many artists, though Chevalier's versions (in English and French) and Frank Sinatra's version are best known.

The song was referenced in the 1963 comedy A New Kind of Love, starring Paul Newman and Joanne Woodward, and featuring Chevalier playing himself.

== Recorded versions ==
- Belle Baker (1930)
- Eileen Barton
- Connee Boswell (1956) (for her album Connee)
- Al Bowlly (1930) (see Al Bowlly Discography)
- Ruby Braff
- Page Cavanaugh and Mike McCaffrey
- Serge Chaloff
- Maurice Chevalier (Film Soundtrack) (1930)
- Doris Day (1953)
- Sammy Fain
- Ella Fitzgerald with an orchestra directed by Marty Paich recorded it for Ella Swings Lightly (1958).
- Benny Goodman and his Orchestra (1945)
- High Hatters (1930)
- The Hi-Lo's - A Musical Thrill (2006)
- Teddi King - All the King's Songs (1959)
- Peggy Lee (1946)
- Vera Lynn (1964)
- Marx Brothers (featured in the film Monkey Business, 1931)
- Liza Minnelli (featured in the film New York, New York, 1977)
- Tony Pastor and his Orchestra (1950)
- Les Paul & Mary Ford (1961)
- Les Paul and Chet Atkins for their Chester and Lester album with bonus tracks
- Louis Prima and Gia Maione
- Frank Sinatra on Songs for Swingin' Lovers! (1956) and Sinatra '65 (1965)
- Carol Sloane
- Helen Ward (1953) (this reached the Billboard charts peaking at No. 30).
- Ethel Waters (1930)
- George Wettling
- Paul Whiteman and his Orchestra (vocal: Bing Crosby) (recorded March 23, 1930)
- Teddy Wilson and his Orchestra (vocal: Frances Hunt) (1937)
- Louis Prima Jr. and the Witnesses (vocal: Sarah Spiegel) (2012)
- Boogie Belgique Remix (2014)
