= I Want You to Be My Baby =

1953 jump blues song

"I Want You to Be My Baby" is a jump blues song written by Jon Hendricks for Louis Jordan whose recording, made on May 28, 1953, was released that autumn.

In the summer of 1955, "I Want You to Be My Baby" was remade as the debut disc by Lillian Briggs, resulting in an expedient cover version by veteran vocalist Georgia Gibbs. Producers Hugo & Luigi had Gibbs fly in from her Massachusetts home to New York City in August 1955 to cut "I Want You to Be My Baby" that same afternoon. New York City disc jockeys were provided with acetates of the Gibbs' version by the following morning with regular jockey copies being shipped out Friday 5 August 1955. Neither version of the song would reach the Top Ten. Gibbs' version had the higher chart peak at #14 but it was the rough voiced Briggs, whose version peaked at #18 and sold over a million discs.

== Ellie Greenwich version ==
Ellie Greenwich, who as a teenager saw Lillian Briggs sing her hit at Alan Freed's rock and roll shows, chose "I Want You to Be My Baby" as the song to launch her career as a solo recording artist. Produced by Bob Crewe, Greenwich's version reached #83 in the spring of 1967, marking her only US chart appearance as a recording artist apart from her singles with The Raindrops. She included the song on her 1968 debut solo album Ellie Greenwich Composes, Produces and Sings.

== Billie Davis version ==
The song became a UK Top 40 hit in the autumn of 1968 via a recording by Billie Davis. Produced by Ready Steady Go! co-host Michael Aldred and arranged by Mike Vickers, Davis' version featured a chorale comprising Madeline Bell, Kiki Dee, Kay Garner, Doris Troy and the Moody Blues. The single's failure to rise no higher than #33 was attributed to a strike at the Decca processing plant, which stopped the pressing of discs.

== The Jyve Fyve version ==
In November 1970 the Jyve Fyve reached #50 on the R&B chart with their remake of "I Want You to Be My Baby".

== Other versions ==
In Great Britain, Annie Ross, Jon Hendricks' future co-partner in Lambert, Hendricks & Ross, had an October 1955 single release of "I Want You to Be My Baby" recorded with Tony Crombie & His Orchestra. Neither this disc nor a 1956 UK single release of "I Want You to Be My Baby" by Don Lang charted. In February 1956, the British music magazine NME reported that Ross's version of the song was banned from airplay by the BBC due to the lyric "Come upstairs and have some loving".

The song has also been recorded by Jimmy and the Mustangs, Colin James, Lindisfarne, Natasha England, Janis Siegel, and Leslie Uggams.

A Finnish rendering - "Armaani Sä Silloin Oisit" - was recorded by Wiola Talvikki. The song was also a hit for Chinese singer Grace Chang who performed it in both Mandarin Chinese (我要你的愛 - "Wo Yao Ni de Ai", meaning "I Want Your Love") and English in the late 1950s. Another rendition of the song, entitled "Yaaradi Ni Mohini", appears in a 1958 Tamil film, Uthama puthiran. The song was also adapted as the title song of the Italian TV show Canzonissima in 1960, with the title “Tu lei lui voi noi”, sung by Wilma De Angelis and Johnny Dorelli.

Fairuza Balk, in a role as a part-time jazz singer, performs "I Want You to Be My Baby" in the 2008 film Humboldt County. Jazz singer Sarah Spiegel also recorded the song with Louis Prima Jr. and the Witnesses on the 2012 album Return of the Wildest!
