= New York, New York (1977 film) =

1977 American musical-drama film directed by Martin Scorsese

- Theatrical release poster
- Directed by: Martin Scorsese
- Screenplay by: Earl Mac Rauch; Mardik Martin
- Story by: Earl Mac Rauch
- Produced by: Irwin Winkler; Robert Chartoff
- Starring: Liza Minnelli; Robert De Niro
- Cinematography: László Kovács
- Edited by: Irving Lerner; Marcia Lucas; Tom Rolf; Bert Lovitt; David Ramirez
- Music by: Ralph Burns
- Color process: Technicolor
- Production company: Chartoff-Winkler Productions
- Distributed by: United Artists
- Release date: June 21, 1977
- Running time: 155 minutes
- Country: United States
- Language: English
- Budget: $9 million
- Box office: $16.4 million

New York, New York is a 1977 American musical romantic comedy film directed by Martin Scorsese from a screenplay by Earl Mac Rauch and Mardik Martin, based on a story by Rauch. John Kander and Fred Ebb wrote several songs for the film, including "New York, New York", which became a worldwide hit and standard. A tribute to Scorsese's hometown of New York City, the film stars Liza Minnelli and Robert De Niro as a pair of musicians and lovers.

== Plot ==
On V-J Day in 1945, during a celebration at the Rainbow Room nightclub in New York City, with music provided by the Tommy Dorsey Orchestra, selfish and smooth-talking saxophone player Jimmy Doyle pesters small-time USO singer Francine Evans for her phone number; she declines, wanting nothing to do with him. Coincidentally, his army comrade Eddie DiMuzio has picked up her best friend Ellen Flannery, and both borrow Jimmy's hotel room for the night. When Francine goes to the hotel the next morning looking for Ellen, she notices Jimmy in the lobby, who has been evicted for not paying his weekly hotel bill. Jimmy jumps into Francine's taxi cab and, against her will, she accompanies him to an audition at the Palm Club, where he argues with the club owner. Attempting to get the audition back on track, Francine begins to sing the old standard "You Brought a New Kind of Love to Me", with Jimmy joining in on his saxophone. Impressed, the club owner hires them as a boy-girl act, astonishing Francine.

Francine promises to see Jimmy the next day, but the following morning, her agent Tony Harwell approaches him with a message from her, explaining that she has joined a traveling orchestra led by Frankie Harte. Abandoning the Palm Club, he pursues her and joins the ensemble. Immediately frustrated at being unable to perform his own, more progressive music, he shares with her a composition he constructed and offers to let her provide lyrics if she shares her poetry with him. Touched to discover that her poetry is about him, he drags her to the justice of the peace so that they can get married. Initially annoyed that he had not proposed beforehand, she eventually accepts.

A few months later in early 1946, Frankie retires and passes leadership to Jimmy, who struggles to obtain bookings until Francine becomes lead vocalist. Resentful at being overshadowed by her, he becomes annoyed when she attempts to instruct the band members how to play, but when Francine informs Jimmy of her pregnancy and her plans to give birth in New York, he becomes infuriated. Francine departs, forcing Jimmy to hire a new, inferior lead singer named Bernice Bennett. He then concedes the band to his pianist Paul Wilson, returning to New York City to look for Francine. The couple reunites but resumes arguing after he starts playing nights at the Harlem Club. When they visit the Up Club to see Paul, Bernice and their old band, Jimmy becomes intoxicated and causes a scene.

Some time later, Columbia Records producer Artie Kirks expresses interest in signing Francine to a recording contract; the jealous Jimmy concedingly acquiesces. However, in their car, Jimmy admits his fury about their unborn child, and the violent argument between him and Francine becomes physically violent, causing her to enter labor. Jimmy rushes her to the hospital, where she delivers a boy whom she names after him. However, unprepared to be a father or husband, he abandons her and his newborn son at the hospital.

Years later, in a recording studio, Francine records the powerful anthem "But the World Goes Round," which makes the charts and launches her own entertainment career. In the following years, Jimmy and Francine both find success in the entertainment industry; he becomes a renowned jazz musician who owns his own club named The Major Chord, while she becomes a successful singer and film actress. Jimmy records a saxophone version of his self-written song, "New York, New York," which tops the jazz charts. One night, he goes to see Francine perform at the Starlight Terrace; her rendition of his track, for which she has provided lyrics, is acclaimed by a wildly appreciative audience. Afterwards, the two have a brief, awkward reunion at the backstage party; he then departs, spending some time with their young son on the way out. He then telephones her from a pay phone in the street, suggesting she join him for dinner at a Chinese restaurant. Francine agrees, but as she heads toward the stage-door exit, she changes her mind and departs via another route. Jimmy, waiting on the sidewalk, realizes that he has been stood up and walks down the street alone.

== Cast ==
- Liza Minnelli as Francine Evans
- Robert De Niro as Jimmy Doyle
- Lionel Stander as Tony Harwell
- Barry Primus as Paul Wilson
- Mary Kay Place as Bernice Bennett
- Frank Sivero as Eddie DiMuzio
- Georgie Auld as Frankie Harte
- George Memmoli as Nicky
- Harry Northup as Alabama
- Dick Miller as Palm Club Owner
- Clarence Clemons as Cecil Powell
- Casey Kasem as DJ aka Midnight Bird
- Jack Haley as Master Of Ceremonies
- Adam David Winkler as Jimmy Doyle Jr.

== Production ==
Irwin Winkler's purchase of the screenplay for New York, New York caught Martin Scorsese's attention before he began filming Taxi Driver. Winkler and Robert Chartoff had agreed to a four-year contract with United Artists, at which they would release a minimum of 12 films, and New York, New York was the first that was produced under the deal. They announced Scorsese as the director in April 1975, with a budget of $3.5 million. Lynn Stalmaster was the casting director. Filming began on June 14, 1976.

Scorsese wanted to marry the movie musical of his parents' generation with a documentary style. He hoped that the juxtaposition would emphasize the continuity between human relationships through history. The actors would improvise on the script in front of the massive, unrealistic sets that fit the musical style. Having recently won the Palme d'Or, Scorsese felt that he could improve the script during filming, but his excesses led to mistakes, such as the opening V-J Day sequence being overly long. The initial cut of the film was four and a half hours.

Scorsese's cocaine addiction made matters worse, and according to Peter Biskind, the director was also taking lithium to control his anger. Scorsese lamented, "I was just too drugged out to resolve the structure." He stopped press interviews one day short because, as he explained, he had run out of cocaine. He concluded, "It's a miracle that the film makes any kind of sense."

The director had an affair with Liza Minnelli during filming, and his second wife Julia Cameron was often on set in an attempt to catch them. The improvisation of dialogue was an additional strain on Minnelli, who was not used to method acting. The stress is sometimes visible in her scenes with De Niro. Before their relationship ended, Scorsese directed Minnelli in The Act, a Kander and Ebb musical that some saw as a spinoff of this film.

Robert De Niro studied the saxophone with Georgie Auld, a veteran of swing giants Artie Shaw and Benny Goodman's bands. Auld also played bandleader Frankie Hart in the film. De Niro was so demanding of Auld's time that the musician felt like a "slave", and his wife worried that the actor would be joining them in bed with the instrument. Auld recorded the saxophone parts in the film, and De Niro mimed to them on set. Auld stood off-camera and would make a slashing motion if De Niro made a fingering or breathing mistake.

The film cost $9 million, which was $2 million over the original budget, and was a much larger amount than the budgets for Scorsese's previous films. George Lucas predicted that the gross would improve by $10 million if Scorsese would change the ending to a happy one.

Scorsese considered having a cameo appearance in the film, but declined because he would have had to shave his beard.

== Releases ==
The film was released on June 21, 1977, with a running time of 155 minutes. The box-office failure of the film prompted United Artists to shorten the film to 136 minutes for Europe.

In 1981, the film was re-released with a runtime of 163 minutes. Scorsese had spent $350,000 of the budget on filming a musical-within-a-musical called "Happy Endings", which depicts Francine Evans as a movie star. The twelve-minute sequence was choreographed by Ron Field. The scene was restored in the 1981 version, and the expanded film earned praise for its ironic look at Hollywood musicals.

== Music ==
=== Theme song ===
Fred Ebb and John Kander's initial submission for the theme song was deemed so bad that Robert De Niro rejected it outright. The lyrics began, "They always say it's a nice place to visit, but I wouldn't want to live here", and the melody was completely different. The eventual song, "Theme from New York, New York", begins with one of Kander's famous vamps, derived from the ragtime practice of putting the melody underneath a repeated note.

The song was released as a single from the soundtrack album, and peaked at #104 on the Billboard chart. Two years later, Frank Sinatra recorded a cover version for his triple album Trilogy: Past Present Future. On June 14, 1980, the single reached #32 on the Billboard Hot 100 and was Sinatra's last Top 40 hit. Both Sinatra's and Minnelli's versions have become closely associated with Manhattan in New York City. Sinatra performed the number at nearly all of his concerts until his retirement in 1995, and Minnelli continues to perform it at nearly all of hers.

=== Soundtrack ===
The LP soundtrack for New York, New York is a double album. It is produced, conducted and arranged by Ralph Burns.

Side 1
| No. | Title | Writer(s) | Performers | Length |
|---|---|---|---|---|
| 1. | "Main Title" | Fred Ebb and John Kander | | 1:53 |
| 2. | "You Brought a New Kind of Love to Me" | Sammy Fain, Irving Kahal, and Pierre Norman | Liza Minnelli | 1:47 |
| 3. | "Flip the Dip" | Georgie Auld | Georgie Auld | 2:13 |
| 4. | "V.J. Stomp" | Ralph Burns | | 1:08 |
| 5. | "Opus Number One" | Sy Oliver | | 8:49 |
| 6. | "Once in a While" | Michael Edwards and Bud Green | Liza Minnelli | 2:17 |
| Total length: | | | | 18:07 |

Side 2
| No. | Title | Writer(s) | Performers | Length |
|---|---|---|---|---|
| 1. | "You Are My Lucky Star" | Nacio Herb Brown and Arthur Freed | Liza Minnelli | 1:15 |
| 2. | "Game Over" | Georgie Auld | | 2:22 |
| 3. | "It's a Wonderful World" | Jan Savitt, Johnny Watson, Harold Adamson | | 2:06 |
| 4. | "The Man I Love" | George and Ira Gershwin | Liza Minnelli | 3:17 |
| 5. | "Hazoy" | Ralph Burns | | 2:36 |
| 6. | "Just You, Just Me" | Jesse Greer and Raymond Klages | Liza Minnelli | 2:25 |
| Total length: | | | | 14:01 |

Side 3
| No. | Title | Writer(s) | Performers | Length |
|---|---|---|---|---|
| 1. | "There Goes the Ball Game" | Kander and Ebb | Liza Minnelli | 1:30 |
| 2. | "Blue Moon" | Richard Rodgers and Lorenz Hart | Robert De Niro & Mary Kay Place | 3:26 |
| 3. | "Don't Be That Way" | Benny Goodman, Edgar Sampson, and Mitchell Parish | | 0:42 |
| 4. | "Happy Endings" | Kander and Ebb | Liza Minnelli & Larry Kert | 11:35 |
| Total length: | | | | 17:13 |

Side 4
| No. | Title | Writer(s) | Performers | Length |
|---|---|---|---|---|
| 1. | "But the World Goes 'Round" | Kander and Ebb | Liza Minnelli | 3:55 |
| 2. | "Theme from New York, New York" | Kander and Ebb | Georgie Auld | 3:42 |
| 3. | "Honeysuckle Rose" | Fats Waller and Andy Razaf | Diahnne Abbott | 2:14 |
| 4. | "Theme from New York, New York" | Kander and Ebb | Liza Minnelli | 3:15 |
| 5. | "Theme from New York, New York (Orchestral Reprise)" | Kander and Ebb | | 1:13 |
| Total length: | | | | 14:19 |

"Happy Endings" was recorded for the film but edited out of the theatrical release.

=== Personnel ===
- Abe Most – Clarinet
- Bob Tricarico, Jerome Richardson – Saxophone
- Chauncy Welsh, Jim Cleveland – Trombone
- Conte Condoli, Snooky Young, Warren Luening – Trumpet
- Russ Freeman – Piano
- Jim Hughart – Bass
- Bill LaVorgna, Sol Gubin – Drums
- John Neal – Engineer

=== Charts ===
| Chart (1977) | Peak position |
|---|---|
| Australia (Kent Music Report) | 92 |
| United States (Billboard 200) | 50 |

== Reception ==
=== Box office ===
The film underperformed to expectations at the box office, grossing $16.4 million against a $9 million budget. The disappointment depressed Scorsese and worsened his drug addiction. Certain that New York, New York would be a hit, United Artists structured the film's box office as a bulwark against the flop that they had expected in Rocky. The two productions pooled their profits, but Rocky ended up covering the losses of Scorsese's movie.

In his introduction to the film's DVD release, Scorsese explains that he intended for the film, which he saw as an homage to the musicals of Classical Hollywood cinema, to break from the gritty realism for which he had become famous, hence the deliberately artificial sets and storyline. He acknowledges that the experiment did not please everyone.

=== Critical response ===
The film has an overall critical score of 58% with a mean of 6.8 of a possible 10 on Rotten Tomatoes, based on 52 reviews; the site's consensus explains, "Martin Scorsese's technical virtuosity and Liza Minnelli's magnetic presence are on full display in New York, New York, although this ambitious musical's blend of swooning style and hard-bitten realism makes for a queasy mixture."

Christopher Porterfield wrote in Time, "If this movie were a big-band arrangement, it would be a duet for a sax man and a girl singer, but with the soloists in a different key from the band."

Vincent Canby of The New York Times wondered, "Why should a man of Mr. Scorsese's talent be giving us what amounts to no more than a film buff's essay on a pop-film form that was never, at any point in film history, of the first freshness?"

Roger Ebert of the Chicago Sun-Times lamented, "Scorsese's New York, New York never pulls itself together into a coherent whole, but if we forgive the movie its confusions we're left with a good time."

In the Chicago Reader, Dave Kehr concluded, "Scorsese created a very handsome and dynamic film, but the spectacular set pieces don't add up to much."

Variety raved, "A final burst from Old Hollywood, Minnelli tears into the title song and it's a wowser."

Time Out's Geoff Andrew enthused, "Scorsese's tribute/parody/critique of the MGM musical is a razor-sharp dissection of the conventions of both meeting-cute romances and rags-to-riches biopics.

Independent reviewer Gene Shalit said that the argument between Francine and Jimmy in the parked car was the most realistic he had ever seen on film.

In Cinéaste, Leonard and Barbara Quart called the film "an interesting and at sometimes exciting failure..." They pointed out the self-conscious parallels with the work of Liza's mother in A Star Is Born, and praised Scorsese's "stylized settings (gold tinsel snowfalls, claustrophobic reddish interiors, and spotlit, dream-like musical solos)", but felt that they were "too calculated and without purpose". William Harding heaped blame on De Niro's performance: "[He] zooms in on the role as if he were playing Hamlet. His hard work backfires...The character of Jimmy Doyle is completely obscured by the spectacle of DeNiro attempting to come to grips with an impossibly one-note role."

=== Accolades ===
| Award | Category | Nominee(s) | Result | Ref. |
|---|---|---|---|---|
| British Academy Film Awards | Best Costume Design | Theadora Van Runkle | Nominated | |
| British Academy Film Awards | Best Soundtrack | Kay Rose, Michael Colgan, James Fritch, Larry Jost, and Richard Portman | Nominated | |
| Golden Globe Awards | Best Motion Picture – Musical or Comedy | | Nominated | |
| Golden Globe Awards | Best Actor in a Motion Picture – Musical or Comedy | Robert De Niro | Nominated | |
| Golden Globe Awards | Best Actress in a Motion Picture – Musical or Comedy | Liza Minnelli | Nominated | |
| Golden Globe Awards | Best Original Song – Motion Picture | "New York, New York"; Music by John Kander; Lyrics by Fred Ebb | Nominated | |

The film is recognized by American Film Institute in these lists:

- 2004: AFI's 100 Years...100 Songs:
  - "Theme from New York, New York" – #31
- 2006: AFI's Greatest Movie Musicals – Nominated

== Stage musicals ==
=== Brazilian musical ===
The film was adapted into a stage musical in Brazil. It premiered on April 14, 2011, in Teatro Bradesco in São Paulo, with direction by José Possi Neto. The songs were not translated, instead featuring subtitles projected on a digital panel.

=== Broadway musical ===
The film was adapted into a stage musical in the United States. It opened on Broadway on April 26, 2023, at the St. James Theater, following previews that began on March 24.

The production received mixed reviews, with Entertainment Weekly saying that the musical was "deeply flawed, but deeply entertaining", and Elisabeth Vincentelli of The New York Times saying that the show was "The Big Apple, Without Bite".

The Los Angeles Times said that "the film is not good. The new Broadway musical is worse." Due to the poor reviews, lack of Tony Award wins, and high production costs, producers posted a hasty announcement on July 23, 2023, stating that the musical would close on July 30.

== Works cited ==
- Wilson, Michael (2011). Scorsese On Scorsese. Cahiers du Cinéma. ISBN 9782866427023.
