= Footlight Parade =

1933 film by Lloyd Bacon

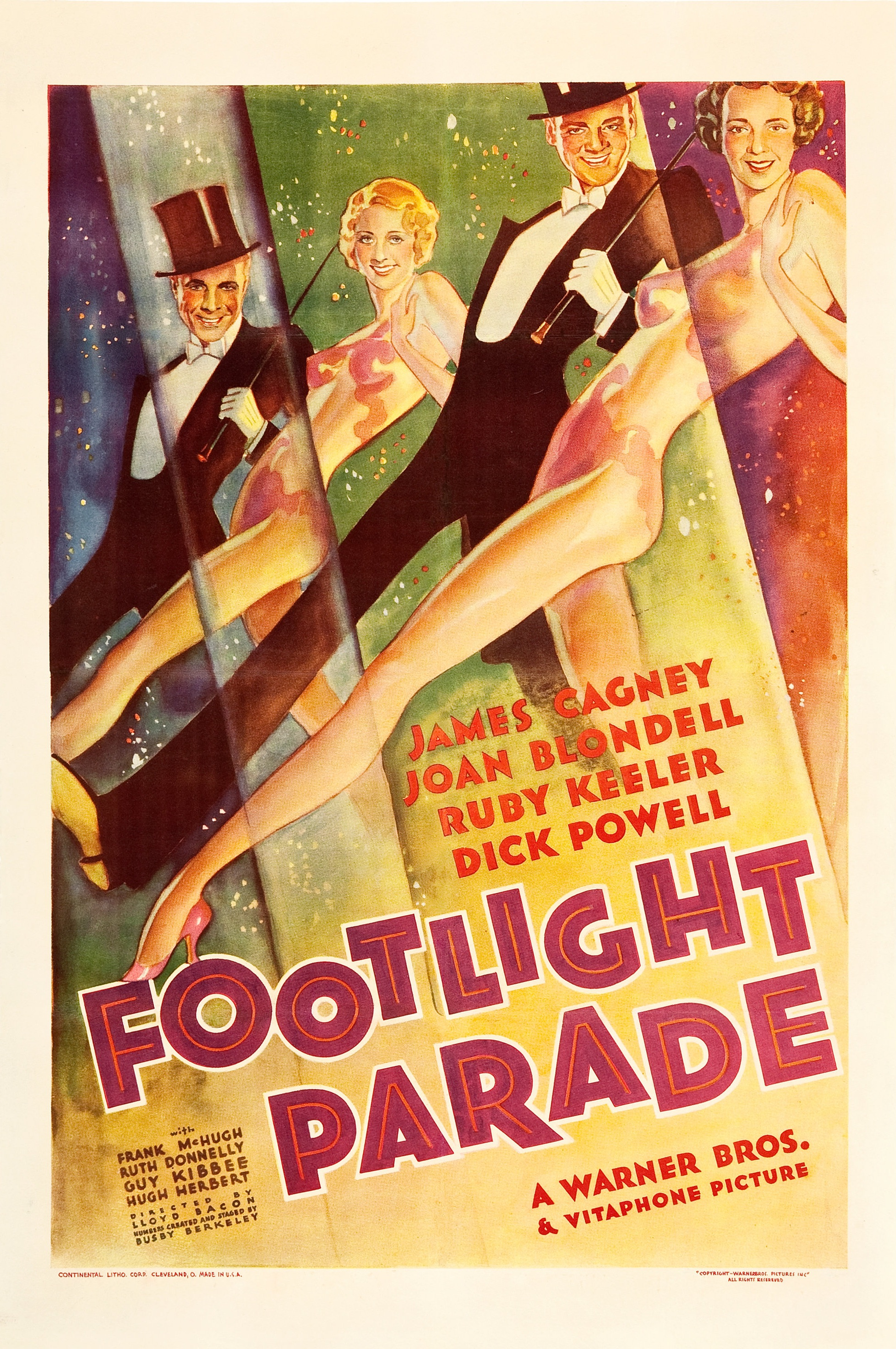
- Original 1933 theatrical release poster produced by the Cleveland School and Continental Lithograph Corp. in Cleveland.
- Directed by: Lloyd Bacon; Busby Berkeley (musical numbers)
- Screenplay by: Manuel Seff; James Seymour
- Story by: Uncredited: Robert Lord; Peter Milne
- Produced by: Robert Lord
- Starring: James Cagney; Joan Blondell; Ruby Keeler; Dick Powell
- Cinematography: George Barnes
- Edited by: George Amy
- Music by: Harry Warren (music); Al Dubin (lyrics); Sammy Fain (music); Irving Kahal (lyrics)
- Distributed by: Warner Bros. Pictures
- Release dates: September 30, 1933 (premiere); October 21, 1933 (general)
- Running time: 102 minutes
- Country: United States
- Language: English
- Budget: $703,000 (est.)
- Box office: $2.4 million

Footlight Parade is a 1933 pre-Code American musical film directed by Lloyd Bacon, with songs written by Harry Warren (music), Al Dubin (lyrics), Sammy Fain (music) and Irving Kahal (lyrics). The film's numbers were staged and choreographed by Busby Berkeley.

The film starred James Cagney, Joan Blondell, Ruby Keeler and Dick Powell, with featured appearances by Frank McHugh, Guy Kibbee, Hugh Herbert, and Ruth Donnelly.

The film's screenplay was written by Manuel Seff and James Seymour, based on a story by Robert Lord and Peter Milne.

Footlight Parade was one of the top-grossing motion pictures released in 1933, earning roughly over $1.6 million at the box office.

In 1992, Footlight Parade was selected for preservation in the United States National Film Registry by the Library of Congress as being "culturally, historically, or aesthetically significant".

== Plot ==
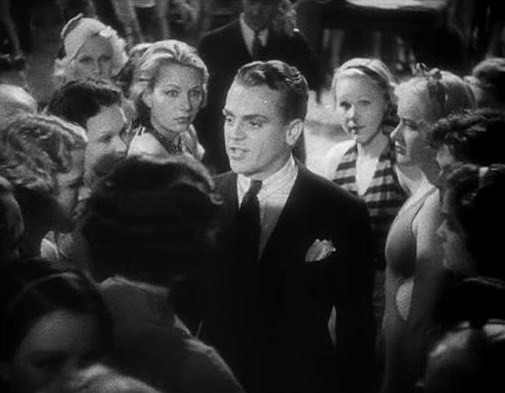
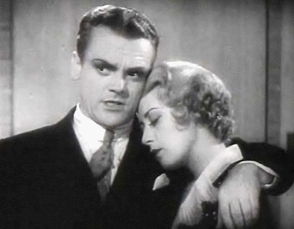
Left: Kent (James Cagney) rallies his troops for their tall order: create three lavish prologues in three days. Right: Cagney as Kent and Joan Blondell as Nan.

Chester Kent replaces his failing career as a director of Broadway musicals with a new one as the creator of musical numbers called "prologues", short live stage productions presented in movie theaters before the main feature is shown. He faces pressure from his business partners to continuously create a large number of marketable prologues to service theaters throughout the country, but his job is made harder by a rival who is stealing his ideas, probably with assistance from someone working inside his own company. Kent is so overwhelmed with work that he doesn't realize that his secretary Nan has fallen in love with him and is doing her best to protect him as well as his interests.

Kent's business partners announce that they have a big deal pending with the Apolinaris theater circuit, but getting the contract depends on Kent impressing Mr. Apolinaris with three spectacular prologues, presented on the same night, one after another at three different theaters. Kent locks himself and his staff in the offices to prevent espionage leaks while they choreograph and rehearse the three production numbers. Kent then stages "Honeymoon Hotel", "By a Waterfall" (featuring the famous "Human Waterfall") and "Shanghai Lil", featuring Kent and Thorn dancing together.

== Cast ==
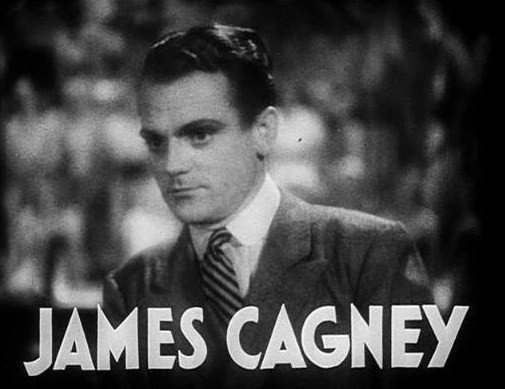

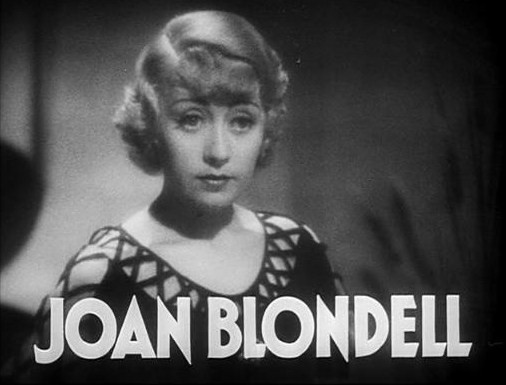

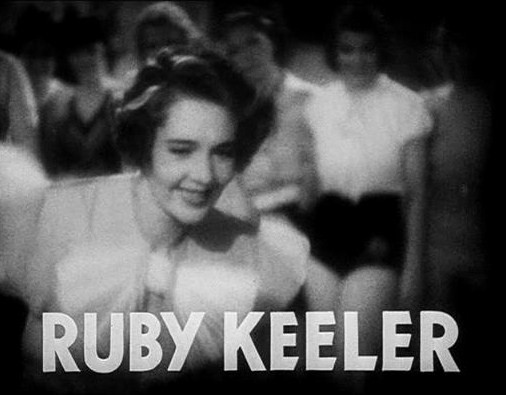

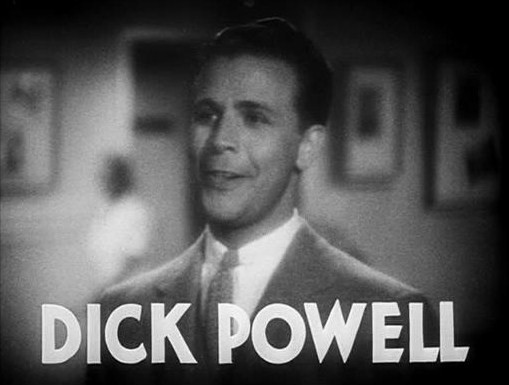

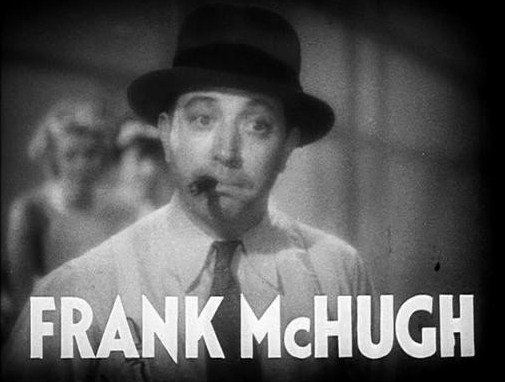

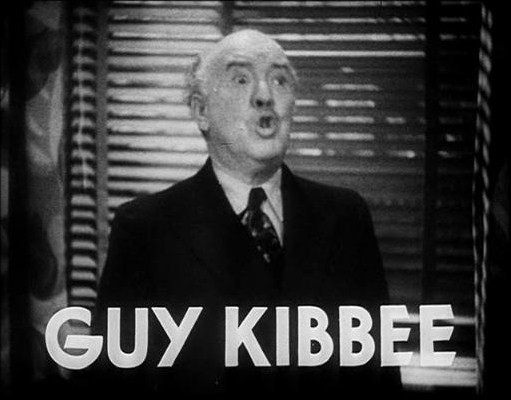

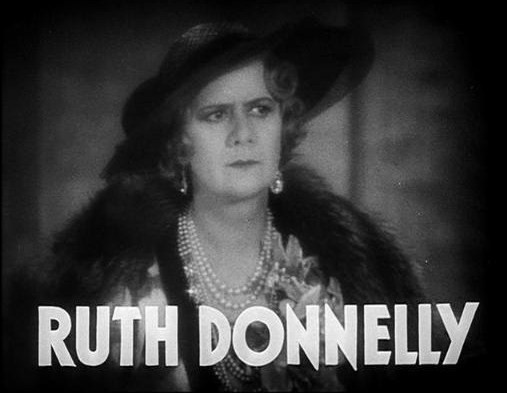

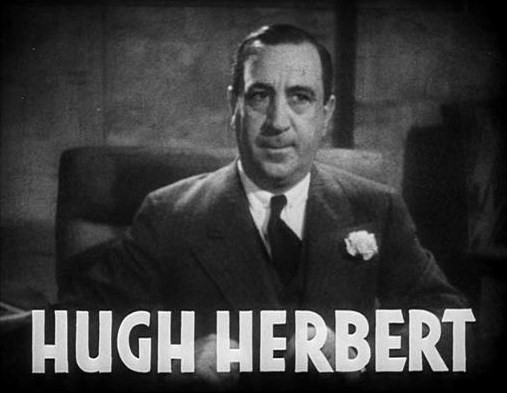

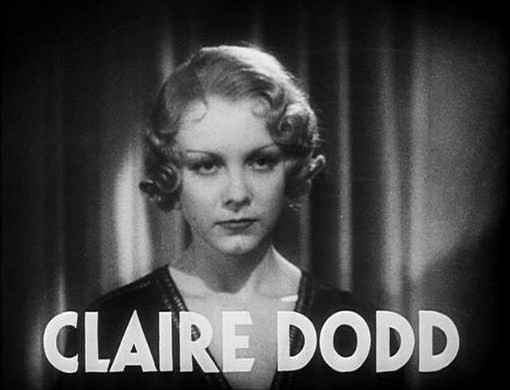
- James Cagney as Chester Kent, creator of musical prologues
- Joan Blondell as Nan Prescott, Chester's secretary
- Ruby Keeler as Bea Thorn, dancer turned secretary turned dancer
- Dick Powell as Scott "Scotty" Blair, juvenile lead who is Mrs. Gould's "protégé"
- Frank McHugh as Francis, the dance director
- Ruth Donnelly as Harriet Gould, the producer's spoiled and nepotistic wife
- Guy Kibbee as Silas "Si" Gould, producer
- Hugh Herbert as Charlie Bowers, Mrs. Gould's brother and the censor of Kent's programs
- Claire Dodd as Vivian Rich, Nan's gold-digging friend who sets her sights on Chester
- Gordon Westcott as Harry Thompson, Kent's assistant
- Arthur Hohl as Al Frazer, the other producer
- Renee Whitney as Cynthia Kent, Chester's greedy estranged wife
- Paul Porcasi as George Apolinaris, owner of a chain of movie theaters
- Barbara Rogers as Gracie, the spy among Chester's dancers
- Philip Faversham as Joe Barrington, another juvenile lead and "protégé" of Mrs. Gould
- Herman Bing as Fralick, the music director
- Billy Barty as "Mouse" and "Little Boy"
- Hobart Cavanaugh as Title-Thinker-upper
- George Chandler as druggist

Cast notes:

- Dorothy Lamour, Victoria Vinton, Ann Sothern and Lynn Browning were among the many chorus girls in the film. It was Lamour's film debut.
- It is sometimes written that John Garfield made his (uncredited) film debut in the "Shanghai Lil" routine in a (5/6ths of a second) shot. Turner Classic Movies perpetuates the mistake in an Article on TCM.com and debunks it in the Notes section of the same entry. The 2003 Turner Classic Movies documentary The John Garfield Story also refutes this, as do several John Garfield biographies that give timelines where he is in New York and then on tour in Chicago with the revival of the play Counsellor-at-Law in 1933.
- The movie briefly shown in the theater early in the film is The Telegraph Trail, starring a young John Wayne and, coincidentally or not, Frank McHugh.

== Musical numbers ==
- "Honeymoon Hotel" – by Harry Warren (music) and Al Dubin (lyrics)
- "Shanghai Lil" – by Harry Warren (music) and Al Dubin (lyrics)
- "By a Waterfall" – by Sammy Fain (music) and Irving Kahal (lyrics)
- "My Shadow" – by Sammy Fain (music) and Irving Kahal (lyrics)
- "Ah, the Moon Is Here" – by Sammy Fain (music) and Irving Kahal (lyrics)
- "Sitting on a Backyard Fence" – by Sammy Fain (music) and Irving Kahal (lyrics)

== Production ==
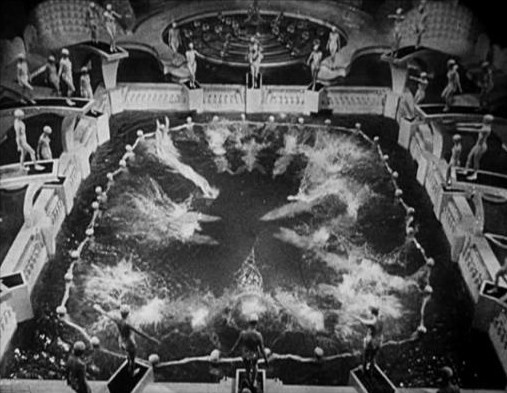
The "By a Waterfall" production number featured 300 choreographed swimmers

Looking for a role different from the gangster films such as The Public Enemy that catapulted him to fame, Cagney actively campaigned for the lead role of Chester Kent, based on well-known impresario Chester Hale of the prologue production company Fanchon and Marco. Cagney had gotten his start in vaudeville and Broadway before going into film work; the film became his first on-screen appearance as a dancer. Cagney had only fallen into his gangster persona when he and Edward Woods switched roles three days into the shooting of 1931's The Public Enemy. That role catapulted Cagney into stardom and a series of gangster films. Throughout his career, Cagney found being typecast as a gangster to be as limiting as it was a benefit.

While Powell's role was written specifically for him, he was replaced by Stanley Smith when he fell ill. When he recovered, Smith's scenes were reshot with Powell. The film became the third pairing of Powell and Ruby Keeler after 42nd Street (1933) and Gold Diggers of 1933, the first two Warner Bros. Busby Berkeley musicals. Similarly, Dorothy Tennant was initially cast as Harriet Gould, but replaced by Ruth Donnelly. Other actors considered for various roles included Eugene Pallette, George Dobbs and Patricia Ellis.

Warner Bros. initially signed for Larry Ceballos to choreograph the film when Berkely was unavailable. However, when Berkeley was able to make changes to his schedule, the studio let Ceballos go. Ceballos subsequently sued Berkeley and the studio for $100,000 for breach of contract.

Production took place at the Warner Bros. studio in Burbank, California between June and September 1933, costing an estimated $703,000 to make (equivalent to approximately $17,484,640 in 2025). It premiered on September 30, 1933, with a general release on October 21.

=== Pre-Code era scenes and promotion ===
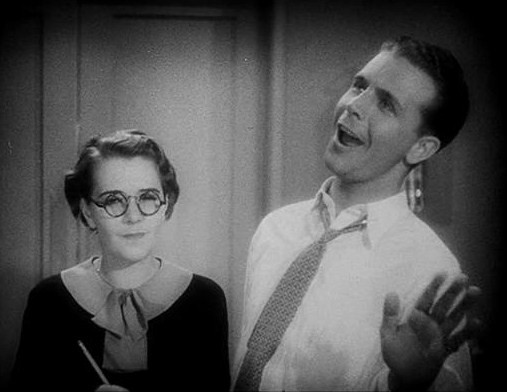
Bea (Ruby Keeler) was not an immediate fan of Scotty (Dick Powell)

The film was made during the pre-Code era, and its humor is sometimes quite risqué, with multiple references to prostitution and suggestions of profanity largely unseen again in studio films until the 1960s, when the Production Code collapsed. For example, Dick Powell's character is being "kept" by Mrs. Gould until he falls in love with another girl.

Joan Blondell's character of Nan Prescott is the center of several lines and moments. She introduces her roommate, Vivian Rich, as "Miss Bi... Rich"; and later, when Vivian tries to take advantage of an intoxicated Chester, Nan kicks her out of their apartment, claiming Vivian will have a job "as long as there are sidewalks". In the Shanghai Lil number, it is clear that Lil and all the other girls are prostitutes working the waterfront bars along with scenes of an opium den. A character played by Hugh Herbert acts as the censor for Kent's productions, constantly telling Kent certain parts of his production numbers have to be changed. His character is portrayed as buffoonish and comical, saying disagreeable lines to Kent such as "You must put brassieres on those dolls..." (referring to actual toy dolls) "...uh uh, you know Connecticut." There is also a scene in which, after seeing black children having fun in the water off a fire hydrant, Chester gets an idea for a prologue involving women dressed in black face and getting wet under a waterfall.

As with many other pre-Code films, including musicals, promotional materials featured scantily clad women on movie release posters, lobby cards and promotional photographs, as seen of Joan Blondell.

== Reception ==
The film made $1,601,000 in the United States, and an additional $815,000 internationally. Warner Bros. reported the film made a profit of $819,080, making it one of the most successful films of the year.

In 1992, Footlight Parade was selected for preservation in the United States National Film Registry by the Library of Congress as being "culturally, historically, or aesthetically significant". Footlight Parade has a 100% rating on the review-aggregator Rotten Tomatoes, based on 13 reviews.

=== Accolades ===
- 1992: National Film Registry by the Library of Congress.
- 2006: AFI's Greatest Movie Musicals – Nominated

== See also ==
- Busby Berkeley using alternate takes to circumvent censorship
- National Recovery Administration (NRA), the logo displayed at start of film and during the Shanghai Lil number after images of the flag and FDR.
