= Angelina (Louis Prima song) =

Single by Louis Prima and his orchestra
- A-side: "Angelina" "Oh Marie"
- Released: 1944
- Genre: Jazz, pop
- Label: Hit
- Songwriters: Allan Roberts; Doris Fisher

"Angelina" is a song written by Allan Roberts and Doris Fisher that was a hit for Louis Prima and his orchestra in 1944.

== Composition ==
The song uses a tarantella rhythm.

== Critical reception ==
Professional ratings
Review scores
Source	Rating
Billboard	favorable

Billboard favorably reviewed the recording (Hit 7106, coupled with "Oh Marie") in its issue from September 30, 1944.

== Track listing ==
78 rpm (The Hit Record 7106)

T440
No.	Title	Writer(s)	Note(s)	Length
1.	"Angelina—FT"	Roberts; Fisher	Louis Prima and his orchestra Vocal refrains by Louis Prima and chorus	3:11

T443
No.	Title	Writer(s)	Note(s)	Length
1.	"Oh Marie—FT"	Everett	Louis Prima and his orchestra Vocal refrains by Lily Ann Carol	2:41
