= Sarah Spiegel (singer) =

American singer

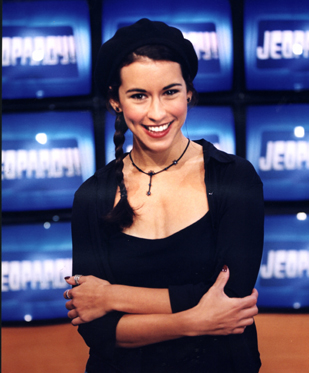
- Spiegel in 2013

Background information
- Born: Long Branch, New Jersey, U.S.
- Genres: Big band, Jazz, Pop, The Great American Songbook
- Occupations: Singer, actress
- Website: sarahspiegel.com

Sarah Spiegel is an American singer and actress who specializes in the Great American Songbook style. She toured for years with the Louis Prima Jr. band, Louis Prima Jr. and the Witnesses, and now performs as a solo artist in concerts and recordings. She has appeared as an actress in television shows such as NCIS, King of Queens, and Boston Public.

== Early life ==
Spiegel was born in Long Branch, New Jersey, to Mel and Fran Spiegel. An only child, she was inspired by her father's love of show business. "Growing up, he always had Broadway shows playing on his record player, so when I showed an interest at age 4, they enrolled me in classes."

Growing up in Belmar, New Jersey, Spiegel studied tap and jazz dancing. She studied acting at the Spring Lake (New Jersey) Theatre Company, where she performed in such plays as Godspell, A Midsummer Night's Dream, and Scrooge. At 14, Spiegel moved with her parents to Jupiter, Florida, where she attended Dreyfoos School of the Arts, majoring in musical theatre. As a senior in high school, she was nominated for a foreign language scholarship from the Pathfinder High School Scholarship Awards. Spiegel won a full scholarship to college and awards of excellence in performance competitions in the areas of solo and duet singing and acting. She studied music and began singing locally and appearing in plays, commercials, TV shows, and films produced in Florida.

== Career ==
Spiegel acted on television and appeared solo in various nightclubs in Florida and around the country. At age 9, she began acting in film and television, including appearances in Nickelodeon's Clarissa Explains It All and Welcome Freshmen, and in a deleted bit part in Woody Allen's New York Stories. From 2008, she hosted industrial shows as a General Motors spokesperson. In 2009, she joined the Louis Prima Jr. band, Louis Prima Jr. and the Witnesses, and toured America for four years as soloist with the band, appearing in Las Vegas, Manhattan, and Los Angeles stops on the tour, as well as in Italy, including an appearance in Louis Prima's family home town of Palermo, Italy. She left the band in 2013 to pursue a successful solo career. Since then, she has opened for Frank Sinatra Jr. and Nancy Sinatra and appeared in concert with Jeff Goldblum and Donny Most.

In November, 2020, Spiegel released an album of songs from World War II, titled As Time Goes By, comprising songs from her 2018 one-woman stage production Through the Perilous Fight (We Never Stopped Singing). The album included an original song, "Dreamtime", with lyrics by Spiegel and music by Spiegel and Carl Byron.

== Personal life ==
In 2012, Spiegel's mother Frances died as a result of medical malpractice. Subsequently, Spiegel formed the Fran Spiegel Right to Know organization to promote awareness of medical malpractice.

Spiegel began a relationship in 2016 with actor Jim Beaver. They were married June 20, 2019, and divorced January 23, 2024.

== Discography ==
=== Singles ===
Title	Release date	Label
"I Dreamed a Dream"	August 25, 2009	Broken Records
"Little Drummer Boy"	December 7, 2010	Broken Records
"Big Daddy (Ya Knock Me Out)"	March 10, 2012	Regal Records
"Mama Sweet Mama (Fran's Song)"	March 8, 2013	Regal Records
"We'll Meet Again"	December 10, 2015	Regal Records
"I'll Be Seeing You"	April 28, 2016	Regal Records
"They're Either Too Young or Too Old"	March 30, 2017	Regal Records
"My Three Beauties"	May 7, 2024	Regal Records
"White Christmas"	October 29, 2024	Regal Records
"Mulholland Drive"	February 6, 2025	Regal Records
"Living My Dream"	May 9, 2025	Regal Records
"September Song"	September 12, 2025	Regal Records
"Song to Sing"	June 5, 2026	Regal Records

=== Albums ===
Title	Release date	Label
As Time Goes By: 1. Introduction; 2. Sentimental Journey; 3. (There'll Be Bluebirds Over) the White Cliffs of Dover; 4. Milkman, Keep Those Bottles Quiet!; 5. We'll Meet Again; 6. They're Either Too Young or Too Old; 7. I'm in the Mood for Love; 8. Comin' in on a Wing and a Prayer (feat. Bea Wain); 9. As Time Goes By; 10. Kiss the Boys Goodbye; 11. I'll Be Seeing You; 12. There's a Star-Spangled Banner Waving Somewhere (feat. Jonathan Clark); 13. When the Lights Go on Again; 14. One for My Baby (And One More for the Road); 15. Dreamtime	November 11, 2020	Regal Records

=== Featured appearances ===
Title	Release date	Album	Label
"Bei mir bist du schon"	July 10, 2012	Louis Prima Jr. and the Witnesses - Return of the Wildest!	Warrior Records
"A Sunday Kind of Love"	July 10, 2012	Louis Prima Jr. and the Witnesses - Return of the Wildest!	Warrior Records
"I Want You to Be My Baby"	July 10, 2012	Louis Prima Jr. and the Witnesses - Return of the Wildest!	Warrior Records
"You Brought a New Kind of Love to Me"	July 10, 2012	Louis Prima Jr. and the Witnesses - Return of the Wildest!	Warrior Records

== Concerts and live performances ==
- NFL "Star-Spangled Banner" performance - Edward Jones Dome (St. Louis) - October 2007, October 2008
- New Orleans Jazz Festival (with Louis Prima Jr. and the Witnesses) - April 2010
- Walk of Fame Ceremony (with Louis Prima Jr. and the Witnesses) - July 2010
- Access Hollywood (with Louis Prima Jr. and the Witnesses) - September 2012 / December 2012
- BottleRock Napa Valley (with Louis Prima Jr. and the Witnesses) - May 2013
- Catalina Jazz Club (headliner) - July 2014
- Vitello's Jazz Club (featured with Don Most) - October 2014
- Through the Perilous Fight, We Never Stopped Singing (one-woman show) - Pico Playhouse - January 2018
