= Don Lang (musician) =

English trombonist and singer (1925–1992)

Don Lang (born Gordon Langhorn; 19 January 1925 – 3 August 1992) was an English trombonist and singer who led Don Lang and his Frantic Five.

== Biography ==
Lang was born in Halifax, England, on 19 January 1925. He and his band appeared on Six-Five Special, the first BBC Television show for teenagers, from 1957. In 1958, his cover version of "Witch Doctor" reached the top 10 of the UK Singles Chart. Lang played trombone on the song "Revolution 1" on the Beatles' 'White Album'. Lang retired in the late 1980s. He died of cancer in London on 3 August 1992, aged 67.

== Discography ==
=== Albums ===
- The Complete '50s Singles – 2012 (Peaksoft) (includes His Master's Voice POP714 from 1960)

=== Singles ===
Don Lang

- HMV POP115: "Cloudburst" / "Seventeen" (1955) – UK No. 16
- HMV POP150: "Four Brothers" / "I Want You to Be My Baby" (1956)
- HMV POP178: "Rock Around the Island" / "Jumpin' to Conclusions" (1956)
- HMV POP224: "Rock and Roll Blues" / "Stop the World I Wanna Get Off" (1956)
- HMV POP260: "Sweet Sue – Just You" / "Lazy Latin" (1956)

Don Lang and his Frantic Five

- Electrola HMV 45-EG 8775: "Red Sputnik Rock (Red Planet Rock)" / "Texas Tambourine" (1956)
- HMV POP289: "Rock Around the Cookhouse" / "Rock Mister Piper"
- HMV POP335: "Rock-a-Billy" / "Come Go with Me"
- HMV POP350: "School Day (Ring! Ring! Goes the Bell)" (1956) – UK No. 26/"Six Five Special"
- HMV POP382: "White Silver Sands" / "Again 'N' Again 'N' Again" (1957)
- HMV POP414: "Red Planet Rock" / "Texas Tambourine" (1957)
- HMV 7EG 8208: "The Big Beat" / "Rock, Rock, Rock" / "Baby Baby" / "Rock Pretty Baby" (1957)
- HMV POP465: "Tequila" / "Junior Hand Jive" (1957)
- HMV POP488: "Witch Doctor" (1958) – UK No. 5/"Cool Baby Cool"
- HMV POP510: "The Bird on My Head" / "Hey Daddy" (1958)
- HMV POP547: "Queen of the Hop" / "La-Do-Da-Da" (1958)
- HMV POP585: "Wiggle Wiggle"/Teasin'" (1959)
- HMV POP623: "Percy Green"/Phineas McCoy" (1959)
- HMV POP649: "A Hoot and a Holler" / "See You Friday" (1959)
- HMV POP682: "Reveille Rock" / "Frankie and Johnny" (1959)
- HMV POP714: "Sink the Bismarck" / "They Call Him Cliff" (1960) – UK No. 43
- HMV POP805: "Time Machine" / "Don't Open That Door"
