= By a Waterfall =

Song
- Released: 1933
- Recorded: His Royal Canadians
- Label: Brunswick Records
- Composer: Sammy Fain
- Lyricist: Irving Kahal

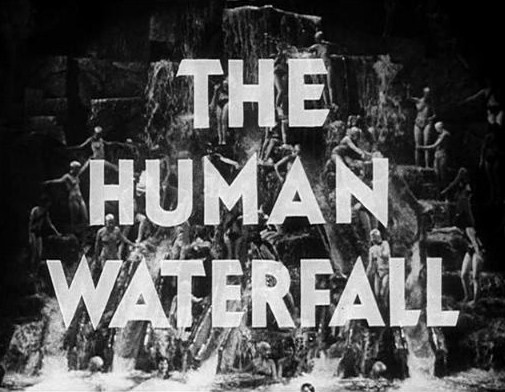
"By a Waterfall" was introduced in the 1933 Warner Bros. film Footlight Parade

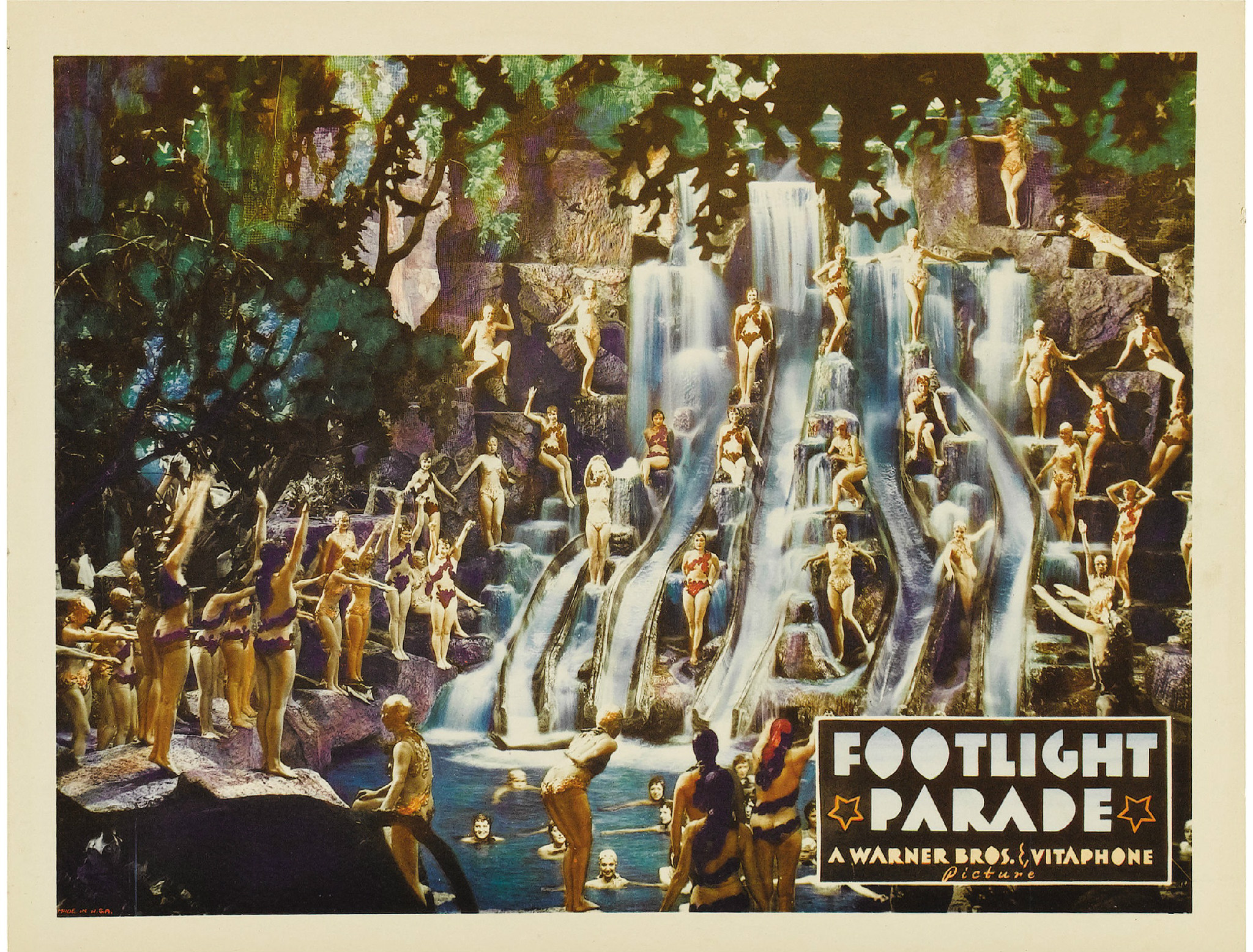
Lobby card for Footlight Parade

"By a Waterfall" is a 1933 song with music by Sammy Fain and lyrics by Irving Kahal. It was featured in an extravagant choreographic arrangement in the film Footlight Parade by Busby Berkeley that features his trademark human waterfall, with vocal performances by Dick Powell and Ruby Keeler. It features a water ballet of chorus girls diving and swimming into the water in elaborate geometric and floral patterns.

The lyrics of the song use the phrase "I'm calling you - oo-oo-oo" in much the same way as the Indian Love Call from the operetta Rose-Marie.

Berkeley realized that screen choreography involved the placement and movement of the camera as well as the dancers. Instead of filming numbers from fixed angles, he set his cameras into motion on custom built booms and monorails and if necessary, cut through the studio roof to get the right shot.

Berkeley used a 40-by-80-foot (12 by 24 m) swimming pool that filled an entire soundstage. Its walls and floor were glass, and before shooting started 100 chorus girls took two weeks to practice their routines in it. The actual filming lasted six days and required 20,000 U.S. gallons (76,000 liters) of water a minute to be pumped across the set.

== Recordings ==
The recordings by Guy Lombardo & His Royal Canadians (vocal by Carmen Lombardo), Leo Reisman & His Orchestra (vocal by Arthur Wright) and by Rudy Vallee are assessed by Joel Whitburn as the most popular in 1933.

=== Other recordings ===
- Chick Bullock's Levee Loungers recorded the song for Oriole Records (catalog No. 2780A) on October 30, 1933.
- Dick Powell recorded the song for Brunswick Records (catalog No. 6667) on September 27, 1933.
- Ozzie Nelson and his Orchestra recorded the song for Vocalion Records (catalog No. 2547) on September 5, 1933.
