= The Big Pond =

1930 film

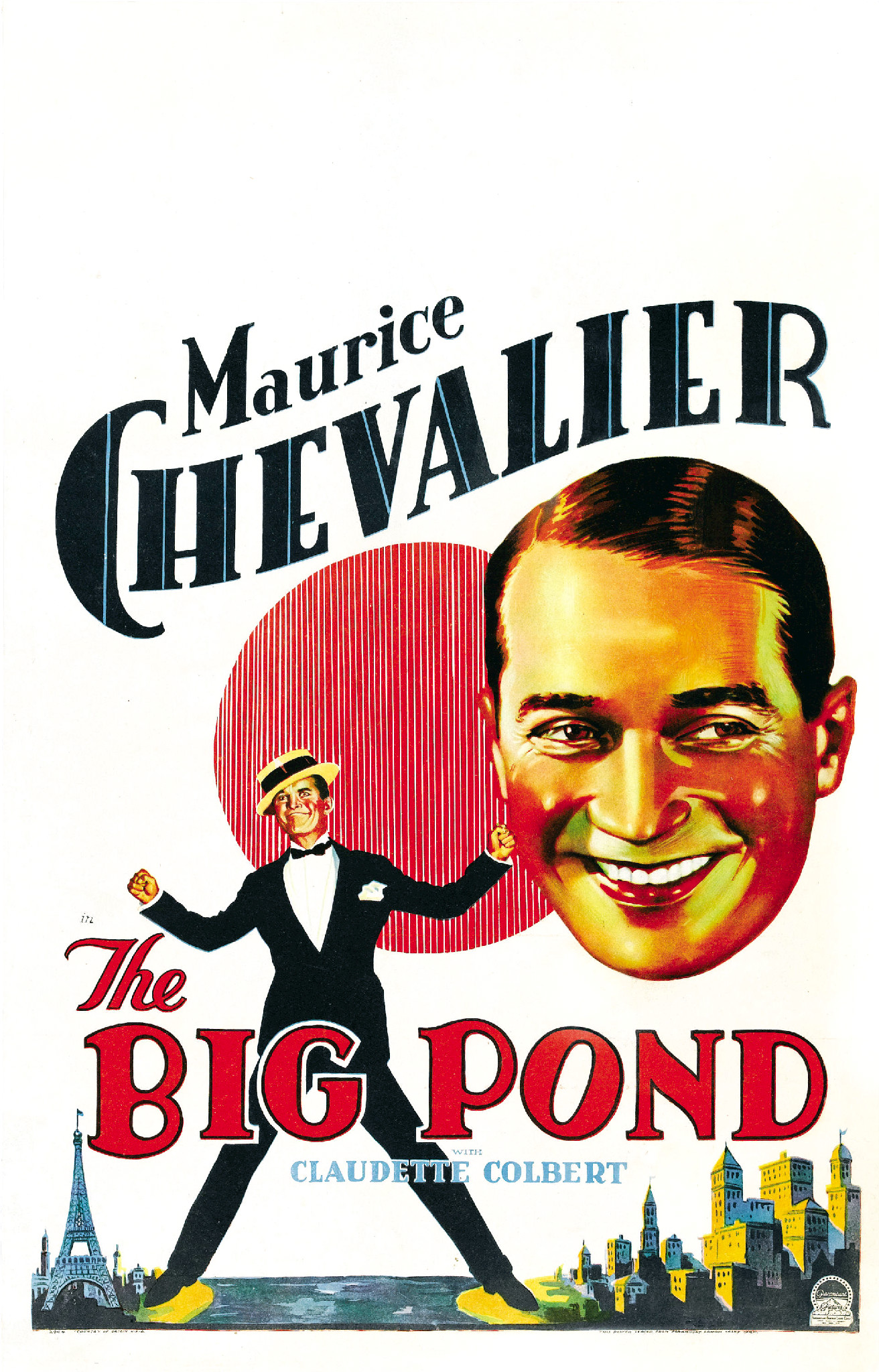
- theatrical poster
- Directed by: Hobart Henley
- Written by: Play: George Middleton; A. E. Thomas; Scenario: Garrett Fort; Robert Presnell Sr. Dialogue: Preston Sturges
- Produced by: Monta Bell
- Starring: Maurice Chevalier; Claudette Colbert
- Cinematography: George J. Folsey
- Edited by: Emma Hill
- Music by: Irving Kahal; Al Sherman; Lew Brown; Ray Henderson; Sammy Fain; Al Lewis; B. G. DeSylva; Pierre Norman
- Distributed by: Paramount Pictures
- Release date: May 3, 1930
- Running time: 78 minutes
- Country: United States
- Languages: English, French

The Big Pond is a 1930 American pre-Code romantic comedy film based on a 1928 play of the same name by George Middleton and A. E. Thomas. The film was written by Garrett Fort, Robert Presnell Sr. and Preston Sturges, who provided the dialogue in his first Hollywood assignment, and was directed by Hobart Henley. The film stars Maurice Chevalier and Claudette Colbert, and features George Barbier, Marion Ballou, and Andrée Corday, and was released by Paramount Pictures.

The Big Pond was nominated for the Academy Award for Best Actor for Maurice Chevalier. It also provided Chevalier with his first American hits "You Brought a New Kind of Love to Me" by Irving Kahal, Pierre Norman and Sammy Fain and "Livin' in the Sunlight, Lovin' in the Moonlight" by Al Sherman and Al Lewis.

== Plot ==
The Big Pond (1930)

During a vacation in Venice, Barbara Billings, daughter of a prominent American chewing gum magnate, falls in love with Pierre Mirande, a French tour guide from a noble family that lost its fortune during World War I. Pierre loves Barbara in return and sings to her that "You Brought a New Kind of Love to Me". Although Barbara's mother likes Pierre, her father and her fiancé Ronnie see him as a fortune-hunting foreigner. In order to get rid of him, Barbara's father decides to give him a job doing the hardest work at his factory across the "big pond" in New York City.

Despite doing tough work, Pierre genuinely enjoys his job, impressing his coworker. He also captivates his landlady and her young helper with his Parisian charm and humor. Unfortunately, Pierre becomes exhausted from his work and falls asleep on the night that he is to attend Barbara's party. He is then fired when he is wrongly accused of spilling illicit rum on chewing gum samples. However, the incident inspires him to devise a new product for the company – rum-flavored chewing gum. The product is a success. He wins back his job and finds favor with Barbara's father, who promotes him.

Although Pierre hopes to use his new position to marry Barbara, he neglects his relationship with her in the process. While he plans to open a new branch of the company in Cleveland and to adopt "You Brought a New Kind of Love" as a new sales jingle, a frustrated Barbara declares that she will marry Ronnie instead. However, Pierre whisks her away in a speedboat and the two reconcile and embrace.

== Cast ==
- Maurice Chevalier as Pierre Mirande
- Claudette Colbert as Barbara Billings
- George Barbier as Mr. Billings
- Marion Ballou as Mrs. Billings
- Andrée Corday as Toinette
- Frank Lyon as Ronnie
- Nat Pendleton as Pat O'Day
- Elaine Koch as Jennie

== Songs ==
- "Livin' in the Sunlight, Lovin' in the Moonlight" by Al Sherman and Al Lewis
- "This Is My Lucky Day" by Lew Brown, B. G. DeSylva and Ray Henderson
- "Mia Cara" and "You Brought a New Kind of Love to Me" by Irving Kahal, Pierre Norman and Sammy Fain

== Production ==
The Big Pond and its French language version La grande mare were shot simultaneously at the Paramount Astoria Studios in Astoria, Queens, New York City. Maurice Chevalier, Claudette Colbert, Andrée Corday and Nat Pendelton played the same roles in both versions.

== Awards ==
Maurice Chevalier was nominated for a 1930 Academy Award for "Best Actor in a Leading Role" for his performance in The Big Pond as well as his performance in The Love Parade (1929).

== French version ==
The French language version of The Big Pond, which was filmed simultaneously with the English version, was called La grande mare. The cast was:

- Maurice Chevalier as Pierre Mirande
- Claudette Colbert as Barbara Billings
- Henry Mortimer as Mr. Billings
- Maude Allen as Mrs. Billings
- Andrée Corday as Toinette
- William B. Williams as Ronnie
- Nat Pendleton as Pat O'Day
- Loraine Jaillet as Jennie

Writer Preston Sturges was fluent in French, but additional dialogue was provided by Jacques Bataille-Henri. The technical credits for the two versions are the same, except the editing for the French version was done by Barney Rogan. One critic noted that the French-speaking audience sounded as though they had picked up on risqué lines that must have been edited-out of the English-language version, due to the Production Code. Chevalier said that this lent extra charm to the French-language versions of his films.
