= Fabulous 208 =

British music magazine

- Issue of 4 June 1966 announcing link with Radio Luxembourg featuring now-disgraced DJ Jimmy Savile.
- Categories: Pop music, teenagers
- Frequency: Weekly
- First issue: 18 January 1964
- Final issue: 27 September 1980
- Country: United Kingdom

Fabulous 208 (retitled Fab 208 from 1975 onwards) was a British pop music magazine.

== History and profile ==
Published weekly between 1964 and 1980 by Fleetway (later IPC Magazines) and aimed at the teenage market, it ran for almost 900 issues, and oversaw a period of considerable change in popular music consumption, from the early years of the Beatles' career to the growth of the music video. Many of its contributors began their professional careers with the magazine including photographers David Steen and Robert Whitaker and writers Quentin Crewe, Sheena Mackay, Neil Aspinall and Michael Aldred.

First published as Fabulous on 18 January 1964, the Beatles appeared on the front cover, espousing the magazine's (then) unique selling proposition: full-colour pinups. At the time, Fabulous's competition - chiefly New Musical Express and Melody Maker - were newsprint publications. As Paul Jobling and David Crowley note, the Beatles went on to appear in every edition of the magazine for the next two years, and several early editions featured no other artists. In June 1966, after a deal with Radio Luxembourg to carry its programme listings and related items, the magazine was retitled Fabulous 208 - 208 metres being Radio Luxembourg's broadcast wavelength. At its peak it had a circulation of 250,000, and for the majority of the 1960s had the biggest market share of its type.

An innovation in the magazine's early years was celebrity guest editors, including Donovan, Cat Stevens, Gerry Marsden, the Kinks and Dave Dee, Dozy, Beaky, Mick and Tich. Although its focus was pop music, Fabulous 208 was the first magazine of its type to cover other pop culture genres: fashion, films and television, and this later extended beyond the media to celebrity footballers such as George Best - a trend which was widely emulated in the late 60s and beyond, most notably by the ITV-sponsored Look-In.

Its readership had always been predominantly female, but as it moved into the 1970s the magazine repositioned itself more explicitly as a girl's publication, placing itself in competition with titles such as Jackie (which itself had launched only weeks after Fabulous) with more fashion features, and models replacing pop stars on the cover in most weeks. By the end of the 1970s it was being outsold by both Jackie and on the pop front by newly launched titles such as Smash Hits (from 1978). After a brief spell as rebranded as Fab Hits it was published for the last time on 27 September 1980, with the Beatles once again on the front cover.
