= The Manuelo Tarantel =

The Manuelo Tarantel is an Italian-American song written by Carl Sigman and Peter de Rose, recorded in November 1949 by Louis Prima. It was originally recorded on Mercury 78 RPM Single 5339. It can now be found on the compilation CD "Beepin' & Boppin'" released May 18, 1999.

The tempo is lively and upbeat. The song tells a story of a small, hard-working Italian village. Every Saturday night they have a dance in the town square and they wait for Manuelo to show up for the party to begin. According to the good humored lyrics: "He won't dance with a single girl, only the married ones".
