= Billie Davis =

British female singer (born 1945)

- Born: Carol Hedges; 22 December 1945 (age 80); Woking, Surrey, England
- Known for: Tell Him; I Want You to Be My Baby; Angel of the Morning
- Musical career
- Origin: London, England
- Genre: Pop
- Occupation: Singer
- Years active: 1962-present
- Label: Decca

Carol Hedges (born 22 December 1945), known professionally as Billie Davis, is an English singer who had hits in the 1960s, and is best remembered for the UK hit version of the song, "Tell Him" (1963) and "I Want You to Be My Baby" (1968).

== Early career ==
She was born in Woking, Surrey, England. Davis' performing name was suggested by the impresario, Robert Stigwood, and was derived from those of blues singer Billie Holiday and the entertainer Sammy Davis Jr. In her teens, Hedges was an engineering secretary before she started her recording career.

After winning a talent contest in which she was backed by Cliff Bennett's band, the Rebel Rousers, she cut some early demo records with the Tornados for record producer Joe Meek. However, her first commercial success, under Stigwood's guidance, was "Will I What", released in August 1962, on which she performed as a foil to Mike Sarne, rather as Wendy Richard had done on Sarne's chart-topping disc, "Come Outside". This reached number 18 in the UK Singles Chart in September 1962.

In February 1963 Davis had her biggest success with a cover version of The Exciters' "Tell Him". Written by Bert Russell (also known as Bert Berns), this song was covered in the sixties by a number of artists, including Helen Shapiro and Alma Cogan, and was successfully revived in the late 1990s by Vonda Shepard, for the American Fox television program, Ally McBeal. Davis' recording reached number ten in the UK chart, and was followed by "He's The One", which crept into the Top 40 in May 1963.

== Setback ==
In 1963, the year in which popular music was transformed by the rise of The Beatles, Davis left Decca records owing to financial disagreements. In September of that year she suffered a broken jaw when a chauffeur-driven limousine in which she and Jet Harris, former bass guitarist of the Shadows, were returning from a concert in Worcester, crashed in the West Midlands. Harris received head injuries that seriously affected his already troubled career. The reporting in the press of a relationship with Harris (24 at the time), an unhappily married man, earned Davis, still only 17, some unwelcome publicity at a difficult time and may have been one of the factors which held back her career. In an interview included in the liner notes of the 2007 compilation CD Whatcha Gonna Do? (RPM 326), Davis acknowledged the scandal, but also placed blame for the "lost momentum" on being unable to record for four months due to having her jaw wired shut after the accident.

== Style ==
Davis was an early proponent of many of the fashion styles for which the 1960s are remembered: bobbed hair, long boots of the kind popularised by Honor Blackman in early episodes of The Avengers, and leather mini-skirts. She was said to have beaten the latter for "percussive effect" when recording. The biographer of the "supergroup" Cream described her as "astonishingly photogenic".

== Later career ==
In 1966, Davis paired with Keith Powell (Keith Powell and the Valets) as "Keith (Powell) and Billie (Davis)" under the Piccadilly record label. They released three singles including "Swingin' Tight", which while popular did not make the chart and the short lived pairing was dissolved. In the late 1960s, Davis returned to Decca, with former Ready Steady Go! presenter Michael Aldred as her producer. Recordings included Chip Taylor's "Angel of the Morning", in 1967, on which she was backed by, amongst others, Kiki Dee and P. P. Arnold. Arnold later recorded the song herself and had the bigger hit in 1968. Davis' final chart entry was a Northern soul version of Jon Hendricks' "I Want You to Be My Baby", originally recorded by Louis Jordan in 1952, which reached number 33 in October 1968, although sales were affected by an industrial dispute at the manufacturing plant.

Davis left Decca in April 1971 after a stay of eight years. She continued to record into the 1980s and was popular, in particular, with audiences in the Spanish-speaking world. Her cover of Burt Bacharach's "The Last One to Be Loved" appeared on the compilation album Trains & Boats & Covers (1999). A retrospective collection of her recordings for Decca was released in 2005.

In 2006, she was re-united with Jet Harris for a series of concerts.

In 2007, RPM Records released Whatcha Gonna Do? Singles, Rarities and Unreleased 1963-1966, compiling Davis's releases between her two tenures with Decca, as well as "What I Will", and five unreleased tracks.

In 2024, Cherry Red Records released Do The Strum! Joe Meek's Girl Groups And Pop Chanteuses (1960-1966), which included five tracks performed by Davis, amongst its three CDs.

== Personal life ==
Davis has lived in North London for most of her life and career. She had two children: her son, born in 1972, was a DJ, but died in 2014. Her daughter, born 1982, is an artist, designer and milliner.

== Discography ==
=== Albums ===
- Billie Davis (Decca, 1970)
- Tell Him - The Decca Years compilation (Universal, 2005)
- Whatcha Gonna Do? Singles, Rarities and Unreleased 1963-1966 compilation (RPM Records, 2007)

=== UK singles ===
- "Will I What" (as 'Mike Sarne featuring Billie Davis') b/w "Bird, You Know I Love Ya" (Mike Sarne only) – August 1962 – Parlophone R4932 UK No. 18
- "Tell Him" (Russell) b/w "I'm Thankful" (Blackwell) – February 1963 – Decca F11572 UK No. 10
- "He's the One" (Blackwell) b/w "V.I.P." (Stephens) – May 1963 – Decca F11658 UK No. 40
- "Bedtime Stories" b/w "You and I" – Sep 1963 – Columbia DB 7115
- "That Boy John" b/w "Say Nothin' Don't Tell" – Feb 1964 – Columbia DB 7195
- "School Is Over" b/w "Give Me Love" – Mar 1964 – Columbia DB 7246
- "Whatcha Gonna Do" (as 'Billie Davis and the LeRoys') b/w Everybody Knows" – Sep 1964 – Columbia DB 7346
- "The Last One to Be Loved" b/w "You Don't Know" – Mar 1965 – Piccadilly 7N 35227
- "No Other Baby" b/w "Hands Off" – Oct 1965 – Piccadilly 7N 35266
- "When You Move, You Lose" (as 'Keith and Billie') b/w "Tastes Sour Don't It" – Jan 1966 – Piccadilly 7N 35288
- "Heart and Soul" b/w Don't Take All Night" – Apr 1966 – Piccadilly 7N 35308
- "You Don't Know Like I Know" (as 'Keith and Billie') b/w "Two Little People" – Jun 1966 – Piccadilly 7N 35321
- "Swingin' Tight" by Barkin/Barash (as 'Keith and Billie') b/w "That's Really Some Good" – Sep 1966 – Piccadilly 7N 35340
- "Just Walk in My Shoes" b/w "Ev'ry Day" – Oct 1966 – Piccadilly 7N 35350
- "Wasn't It You" b/w "Until It's Time for You to Go" – Jun 1967 – Decca F 12620
- "Angel of the Morning" b/w "Darling Be Home Soon" – Nov 1967 – Decca F 12696
- "I Want You to Be My Baby" b/w "Suffer" – Oct 1968 – Decca F12823 UK No. 33
- "Make the Feeling Go Away" b/w "I'll Come Home" – Jan 1969 – Decca F 12870
- "I Can Remember" b/w "Nobodys Home to Go Home To" – May 1969 – Decca F 12923
- "Nights in White Satin" b/w "It's Over" – Nov 1969 – Decca F 12977
- "There Must Be a Reason" b/w "Love" – Oct 1970 – Decca F 13085
- "I Tried" b/w "Touch My Love" – May 1972 – Regal Zonophone RZ 3050
- "I Want You to Be My Baby" b/w "It's Over" – Aug 1972 – Decca F 13334 reissue
- "Anyway That You Want Me" b/w "Everybody Dance" – Jan 1976 – United Artists UP 36058
- "I've Been Loving Someone Else" b/w "Beyond the Pale" – Feb 1976 – United Artists UP 36066
- "Anyway That You Want Me" b/w Somewhere Along the Line" – Jun 1976 – United Artists UP 361178
- "I'll Dance the Ants Back into Your Pants" b/w "If I Ask You to Stay" – Aug 1977 – Phillips 6006 583
- "Run Joey Run" b/w "Easy Come, Easy Go" – Jun 1978 – Magnet MAG 124
- "Bright Lights" b/w "I Want You to Be My Baby" – 1983 – Linero BDT 2
- "The Kiss" b/w "The Kiss" (Remix) – Dec 1984 – Alternative AKISS 1
- "Back in Our Rock 'n' Roll Days" – Nov 1998 – Strange Country 0001
