= Lillian Briggs =

American rock 'n roll performer and musician (1932–1998)

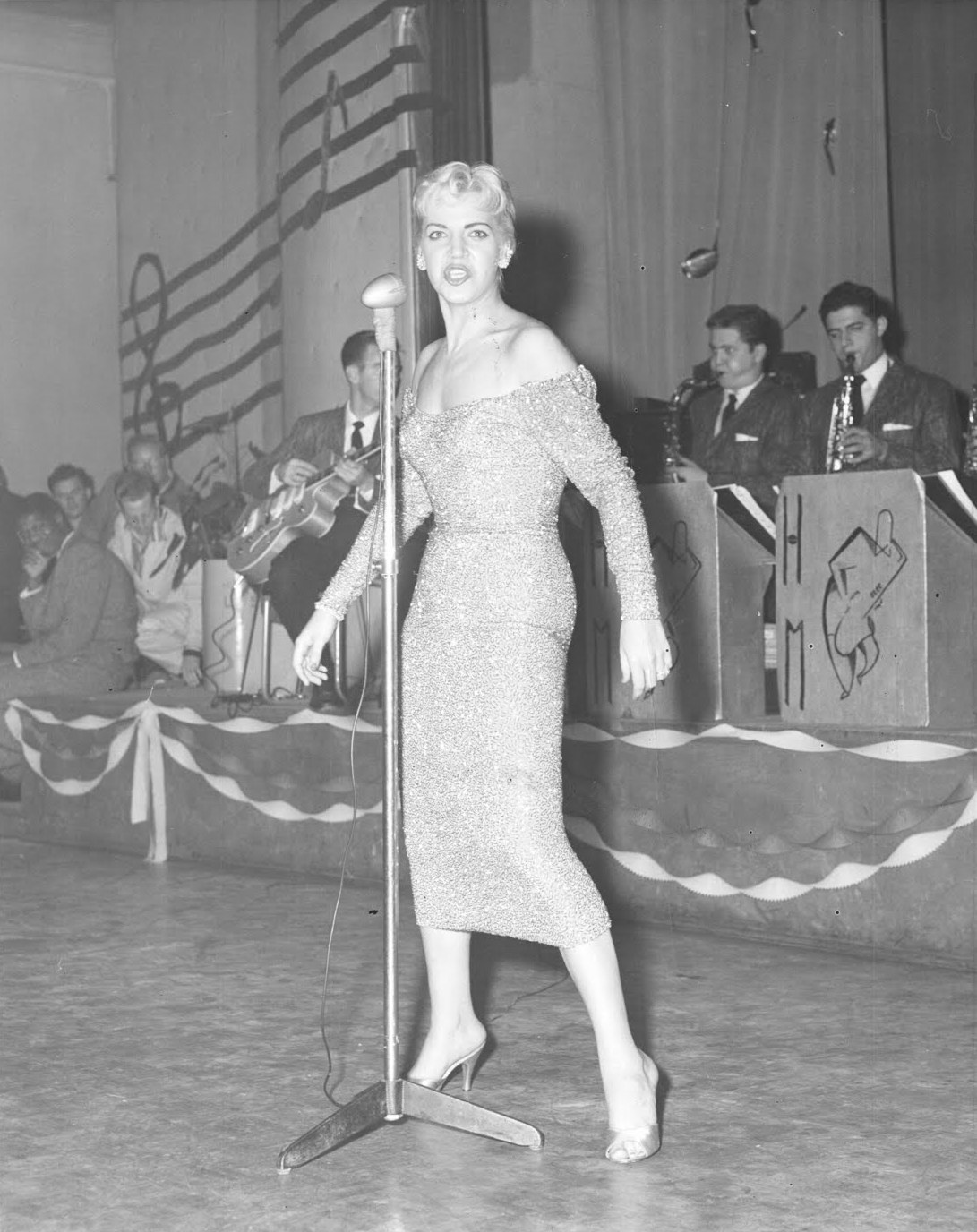
- Briggs performing at the Sands Hotel and Casino in Las Vegas in January 1956
- Born: Lillian Biggs; June 3, 1932; Allentown, Pennsylvania, U.S.
- Died: April 11, 1998 (aged 65); North Miami Beach, Florida, U.S.
- Occupations: Singer, musician

Lillian Briggs (née Biggs; June 3, 1932 – April 11, 1998) was an American rock 'n roll performer and musician.

Briggs was the first woman to achieve star status at the dawn of rock 'n roll in the early 1950s; soon after embarking upon her career, as she toured Australia with Nat King Cole in early 1956, she began being billed as "The Queen of Rock and Roll" during the same period when media began referring to Elvis Presley as the "King" of the new musical genre.

== Early life and education ==
Biggs was born on June 3, 1932, in Allentown, Pennsylvania, where she was raised. Her musical career began as a high school student at Allentown Central Catholic High School, where she said she took up the trombone and joined the school's band so she could attend football games for free.

In the early 1950s, she worked for 14 months as a laundry truck driver in Catasauqua, Pennsylvania, and later as a welder to support herself and finance The Downbeats, a band she formed that drew audiences both on live radio and at public venues in the Allentown area.

== Career ==
In 1953, she joined Joy Cayler's All-Girl Orchestra as a singer and trombonist. A year later, appearing with Cayler's Orchestra at the Arcadia Ballroom in New York City, she performed a version of "Shake, Rattle and Roll" and was discovered by celebrity manager and talent scout Jack Petrill, who signed her as a preferred client, launching her solo career. Briggs toured at sock hops and nightclubs and did radio interviews, driving herself coast-to-coast from one engagement to the next in her white Cadillac convertible.

The following year, in 1954, New York City disc jockey Alan Freed asked her to appear in his New York City stage shows, which led to her being signed with Epic Records later that year.

In 1955, Briggs released her first single, "I Want You to Be My Baby", which sold over one million copies and reached No. 18 on the Billboard Hot 100. During the peak of her career from 1954 to 1964, she headlined at concert venues around the world, starred at major Las Vegas hotels, and appeared on Jack Paar's The Tonight Show, The Mike Douglas Show, American Bandstand, and The Steve Allen Show.

In 1961, she won a role in the movie The Ladies Man. Briggs also recorded several songs on the soundtracks of three Hollywood films: The Fugitive Kind, Mr. Wonderful, and My Sister Eileen. In 1965, she appeared as a contestant on What's My Line?; at the time, she was giving trombone lessons to one of the show's panelists, Arlene Francis.

Briggs continued recording with Sunbeams, ABC-Paramount Records, Coral, and Phillips while touring extensively until the early 1970s, when she relocated to Miami Beach, Florida, to become a co-partner in Turnberry Isle, a luxury condominium resort. Briggs' yacht, Monkey Business, was the boat on which Gary Hart was photographed with Donna Rice, ending Hart's presidential ambitions.

== Death ==
Briggs died of lung cancer at her home in North Miami Beach, Florida on April 11, 1998. A comprehensive compact disc collection of her recordings was released posthumously in 2013 by Jasmine Records.

== Legacy ==
In 2022, Briggs was posthumously given the International Trombone Association's Legacy Circle Award.
