= Marguerita (Louis Prima song) =

Single by Louis Prima and his orchestra
- A-side: "Marguerita"
- B-side: "Bridget O'Brien"
- Released: 1947
- Genre: Jazz, pop
- Label: Majestic
- Songwriters: Maurice Ravel; Sunny Skylar; Louis Prima

"Marguerita" is a song credited to Ravel–Skylar–Prima that was a hit for Louis Prima and his orchestra in 1947.

== Critical reception ==
Professional ratings
Review scores
Source	Rating
Billboard	favorable

Billboard favorably reviewed the recording (Majestic 1100, coupled with "Bridget O'Brien") in its issue from January 18, 1947.

== Track listing ==
78 rpm (Majestic 1100)

Side A (T-931)
No.	Title	Writer(s)	Note(s)	Length
1.	"Marguerita"	Ravel; Skylar; Prima	Fox trot Louis Prima and his orchestra Vocal by Louis Prima

Side B (T-932)
No.	Title	Writer(s)	Note(s)	Length
1.	"Bridget O'Brien"	Prima; Bello	Fox trot Louis Prima and his orchestra Vocal by Louis Prima and Toon-Timers
