= Lily Ann Carol =

American big-band and popular singer (1923–1999)

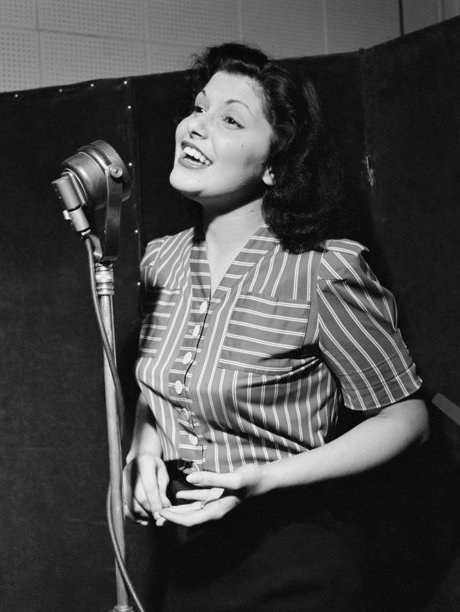
- Born: 1923; Newark, New Jersey, U.S.
- Died: 1999 (aged 75–76); Long Island, New York, U.S.
- Occupation: Singer
- Years active: 1939–1990
- Spouses: Morti Kaufman (1946-); Joseph Barone (1966-1999, her death)

Lily Ann Carol (1923–1999) was an American big-band and popular singer, most famous for being the first vocalist with Louis Prima's orchestra, 1939–1946. She recorded as a solo artist for Signature Records, RCA Victor and Mercury Records in the late 1940s and 1950s and performed with her husband, saxophonist and singer Joe Barone, starting in 1966.

== Early life and education ==
Carol was born in the Weequahic section of Newark, New Jersey, and while a teenager, began singing in shows around the city, where she was seen by Louis Prima. Prima was in the process of abandoning his Dixieland style and forming his first orchestra, which he called "The Band That Plays Pretty For the People". He chose Carol, who was only 16, to become his first vocalist.

== Career ==
Over the next seven years, Carol and Prima recorded several dozen songs for Varsity Records, OKeh Records and Majestic Records. Their popular recordings included "I'll Walk Alone", "Oh Marie", "A Fellow on a Furlough", and "Everybody Knew But Me". They were also very popular in personal appearances and were one of the only white bands to play five engagements at the Apollo Theater in Harlem. While with Prima, she developed the stone-faced singing style later emulated by Keely Smith. In a 1971 interview with the New York Times, she recalled, "If I broke up and laughed at what Louis was doing, there goes my song. So I kept a straight face just to get to sing my song." While with Prima, she filmed the short New Orleans Blues for Universal Pictures. She finished sixth in Down Beat's annual poll of big band singers in 1944 and 1945. In 1946, Carol left the band to begin a solo career and married Morti Kaufman of Newark, New Jersey, while she was performing at the Hippodrome Theater in Baltimore. She recorded that year with Charlie Ventura for National Records and played the nightclub circuit.

Carol recorded under her own name on Signature Records (1949–1950), Prima's Robin Hood label (1951), RCA Victor (1952–1953) and Mercury Records (1956–1957). She later recorded for Cub Records (1958) and Spotlight Records (1966–1967). Her television appearances included the Arthur Murray Party, the Steve Allen Show and the Mike Douglas Show.

While performing at the Top Hat nightclub on Long Island, she met and married saxophonist and singer Joe Barone. They formed a new duo act that they continued to perform for the next 25 years at such venues as the Concord Hotel, Frank Sinatra's favorite haunt Jilly's, the San Su San on Long Island, and Jimmy Weston's in Manhattan, incorporating comedy with their music. They recorded two LP albums, Souvenir and Live From Jupiter's.

She died in 1999 and is entombed at Pinelawn Memorial Park in East Farmingdale, Long Island alongside her husband, who died on May 3, 2006. A CD compilation (Oh Marie!) of her best recordings with Prima was released in 2021 by Jasmine Records (JASMCD2725).
