= Louis Prima Jr. =

- Born: June 16, 1965 (age 61)
- Genres: Jazz; traditional pop; swing; rock
- Occupations: Singer; musician; band leader
- Instruments: Vocals; trumpet; percussion
- Years active: 1986–present
- Labels: Warrior/UMD
- Website: www.louisprimajr.com

Louis Prima Jr. (born June 16, 1965) is an American jazz singer and the son of Louis Prima.

== Early life ==
Louis Prima Jr. is the youngest child of musician and entertainer Louis Prima. His mother Gia Maione began performing with his father in 1962. She taught Louis Jr. to play the drums at 5 years old. He grew up on the outskirts of Las Vegas, on his dad's golf course, Fairway to the Stars, and spent two weeks every summer at his grandparents' house in Toms River, New Jersey. His grandfather, Tom Maione, owned the Red Top Bar at Seaside Heights.

When the Prima family moved to New Orleans, he learned piano. His aunt, Sister Mary Ann, taught piano, and he quickly caught on. The family moved into the home that his father built for his mother on Pretty Acres Golf Course in Covington, Louisiana but soon realized the house might need to be razed due to a termite infestation. The family moved back to Las Vegas.

In school, Prima took band class and told his mother he wanted to play trumpet. He continued playing through high school, and cites his band directors Bruce Cullings and William "Mac" McMosley as major influences in his life. They competed in the Heavy Division of the Chaffey Jazz Festival, and they marched in the Fiesta Bowl and Sun Bowl.

== Musical career ==
After graduating from high school, Prima started college to enter the business world. He landed a good job, with what he believed a future, and dropped out of college after only one semester. Within a year, he found a band that was renamed Problem Child. Problem Child became popular in the local Vegas scene and at several venues in Hollywood. They opened for numerous acts in every genre, from Winger to Savatage.

In 1995, Problem Child disbanded, and Prima shifted his musical focus to his other love, the music and style of his father. Enlisting the talents of his sister Lena, who had long since quit the music business and established herself as a Las Vegas performer, Prima put together a band in his father's mold. With the aid of his father's keyboard player, Bruce Zarka, he assembled a band of some of the top musicians in Vegas. He left the music world and began a career in food and beverage management. He started a family and performed only casually with friends.

For several years Prima juggled the demands of a full-time job, part-time music career, and raising his children. In 2010 at age 44, he quit his lucrative day job. At a stage of life when some performers are hanging up their instruments in favor of more secure employment, Prima, a divorced father of two, gambled on a full-time career bringing his dad's musical style to new generations. "I may be good at management," he said, "but that's not what I was supposed to be doing."

On July 25, 2010, shortly after their performance at the New Orleans Jazz and Heritage Festival (a.k.a. Jazz Fest), and in the year his father would have turned 100, Prima, Sarah Spiegel and the Witnesses were present when his father's posthumous star was put on the Hollywood Walk of Fame.

On July 10, 2012 Prima and the Witnesses released their debut album, Return of the Wildest, on Warrior Records/Universal Music Distribution. Touring in support of Return of the Wildest, the band made their national television debut on Access Hollywood Live. Hosts Billy Bush and Kit Hoover had such a good time dancing along with the band that they were asked to return for the hit television show's Christmas special that had guest Henry Winkler jumping out of his seat to join in. Their worldwide tour continued through October 2013, and included a performance at the first BottleRock Napa Valley festival. sharing the bill with Macklemore, Black Keys, Zac Brown Band, and Kings of Leon.

Prima's second album, titled Blow, was recorded at Capitol Records in the same studio where his father and mother recorded.

== Discography ==
- Return of the Wildest (Warrior, 2012)
- Blow (Warrior, 2014)
