= Lena Prima =

American jazz singer (born 1963)

- Born: Las Vegas, U.S.
- Genres: Jazz; swing
- Occupations: Singer; entertainer
- Label: Basin Street Records
- Website: www.lenaprima.com

Lena Prima is an American jazz singer. She is the daughter of singer, trumpeter and recording star Louis Prima and Gia Maione, his fifth wife.

== Early life ==
Born in Las Vegas, her childhood was divided between that city and the New Orleans/Covington area of Louisiana. She often traveled with her father on his road trips and frequently performed with him on stage. During this time, Lena's mother, a classically trained singer and the stage partner of her husband, Louis, taught Lena to play drums, which she continues to play on stage today. Lena developed a love for performing during these early years of her life.

Lena's father, Louis, often told her stories about his life in show business. He also taught her about the culture and traditions in his native New Orleans. When Lena was 11, her father underwent surgery for a benign brain tumor. He subsequently fell into a coma from which he never awakened. He died in 1978 when Lena was 14. Remembering her father, Lena said, “He was like a magical creature, bigger than life, with so much charisma. He always had a twinkle in his eye, smiling, laughing and joyful.” Lena enrolled in college at 18, but soon dropped out to be a professional entertainer, like her father.

== Career ==
Lena's singing career began with rock bands, despite her mother's objection to her pursuing a music career. While working a series of day jobs, Lena sang with many bands, sometimes sneaking in the back door because she was underage. Lena formed a band, Rough Angel, which recorded an album with producer Geoff Workman (The Cars, Queen, Journey, Mötley Crüe). The group eventually stalled and, when grunge took over the rock scene, Lena left rock music and found she could earn a living singing with lounge and cover bands.

While performing with Spiral Starecase on a cruise, Lena, at the urging of some musician friends, put a tribute show together to honor her father. The tribute evolved and grew into the show she performs today.

In 2005, Hurricane Katrina and the damage it made to her father's hometown made an impact on Lena. She brought her band to New Orleans to perform a benefit concert hurricane and flood relief. The visit, coupled with Lena's appearance at the New Orleans Jazz and Heritage Festival in 2010, inspired her to move with her husband to New Orleans in 2011. She continues to call the Crescent City home.

In 2018, Lena concluded a seven-year residency at the Hotel Monteleone in the French Quarter. In New Orleans, she has performed at the New Orleans Jazz & Heritage Festival, and French Quarter Festival.

== Recording ==
Lena has recorded six albums. Her recordings include 2010's Since the Storm, a collection of swing, jazz, ballads and originals. Pennies From Heaven (2012) is a live album recorded at the Gold Coast Showroom in Las Vegas. Starting Something, released in 2015, is an autobiographical project recorded after Lena's move to New Orleans. It features local musicians and singers and many original songs. In 2018, Lena signed with Basin Street Records. In early 2019, the label released Prima la Famiglia, which appeared on the Billboard Jazz Albums chart.

== Discography ==
1. Reminiscing 2001
2. Since the Storm 2010 (11th Hour Records)
3. Pennies From Heaven 2012
4. Starting Something 2014 (Aftergroove)
5. Christmastime is Here 2014
6. Live at the Dew Drop Jazz and Social Hall 2016
7. Prima La Famiglia 2019 (Basin Street Records)
