= Pierre Norman =

American clergyman, songwriter, and composer

Pierre Norman, born Joseph P. Connor (November 16, 1895 – March 31, 1952), was an American clergyman, songwriter, and composer. He was born in Kingston, Pennsylvania, United States, and died in Teaneck, New Jersey.

As a songwriter he is most famous for co-writing two songs: "You Brought a New Kind of Love to Me" (1930) that appeared in the Maurice Chevalier movie The Big Pond (1930) and "When I Take My Sugar to Tea" (1931), both of which were used in the Marx Brothers movie, Monkey Business, and both of which were co-written with Sammy Fain and Irving Kahal. He joined ASCAP in 1925.

He was educated at the Wyoming Conservatory and St. Bonaventure College where he received among other degrees, a Doctor of Music. He also received a musical degree from the Benedictine Fathers. He also studied with Ergildo Martinelli. He was the pastor of St. John's Church in Cliffside, New Jersey; chaplain of the New Jersey State Police for 24 years; and the New Jersey State Guard.

== Songs ==
- "You Brought a New Kind of Love to Me" (from the 1930 film, The Big Pond)
- "The Golden Dawn" (from the 1930 film, Golden Dawn)
- "Little Did I Know" (1930) (words by Pierre Connor & Irving Kahn; music by Vernon Duke & Sammy Fain)
- “Back Home” (1930) (words and music by Irving Kahal, Sammy Fain and Pierre Norman)
- “Homemade Sunshine” (1930) (words by Pierre Connor & Irving Kahal; music by Sammy Fain)
- “I’ve Got “It”, But It Don’t Do Me No Good” (1930) (words by Irving Kahal; music by Sammy Fain & Pierre Norman)
- “If You Could Just Forgive and Forget, I’d Fall in Love all Over Again” (1930) (word by Irving Kahal; music by Sammy Fain & Pierre Norman)
- “Mia Cara” (1930) (words by Irving Kahal; music by Sammy Fain & Pierre Norman)
- “Once a Gypsy Told Me You Were Mine” (1930) (words and music by Sammy Fain, Irving Kahal & Pierre Norman)
- “Satan’s Holiday” (used in the 1930 film Follow the Leader) (words and music by Sammy Fain, Irving Kahal & Pierre Norman Connor)
- "When I Take My Sugar to Tea" (from the 1931 film Monkey Business)
- "Lillies of Lorraine"
- "The Far Green Hills of Home"
- "Little Black Dog"
- "I Shall Return"
- "Lord's Prayer"
- "Our Father"
- "Ave Maria"
- "Miracle of the Bells"
