= Gia Maione =

American singer (1941–2013)

- Also known as: JoAnn Maione
- Born: May 20, 1941; Roebling, New Jersey, U.S.
- Died: September 23, 2013 (aged 72) Pensacola, Florida, U.S.
- Genre: Jazz
- Occupation: Singer
- Years active: 1962–2013
- Spouse: Louis Prima (m. 1963–1978; his death)

Gia Maione Prima (May 20, 1941 – September 23, 2013) was an American jazz singer and the fifth wife of musician/entertainer Louis Prima.

== Biography ==
Born in the Roebling section of Florence Township, New Jersey, Maione lived in Bordentown before moving with her family to Toms River, New Jersey. She was a 1959 graduate of Toms River High School (since renamed as Toms River High School South).

Maione first gained notice in 1962, when she was signed to sing lead female vocals for Prima and his band. Prima had divorced Keely Smith, his former lead vocalist, the year before. Smith left the orchestra, creating the opening that Maione filled.

In 1963, she married Prima, becoming his fifth and final wife. She had two children with Prima, a daughter named Lena and a son named Louis Prima Jr.

In 1965, the couple recorded Let's Fly With Mary Poppins, a popular album containing jazz versions of songs from the popular Disney film. The couple routinely performed at locations such as the Copacabana, the Sahara Hotel, the Sands Hotel, and the Palmer House in Chicago. Although paired with Prima near the end of his career, Prima, Maione and the orchestra remained extremely popular and sang to sold-out crowds up to 1975. In 1975, while undergoing an operation in Los Angeles to remove a benign brain tumor, Prima lapsed into a coma and never regained consciousness. He died almost three years later on August 24, 1978, in his native New Orleans.

The Prima estate was tied up in litigation for almost 15 years following Prima's death. Maione handled the licensing of Prima's work for television, film and advertising, such as the use of 'Jump, Jive and Wail' for a series of Gap ads in the late 1990s. While living in Island Heights, New Jersey in 2002, she filed suit against Unidisc Music claiming that proper royalties had not been paid. Owing to this, Gia forbade Disney Studios to reuse Prima's character King Louie in The Jungle Book 2 and the House of Mouse episode, King Larry Swings In.

In a 2003 interview, she stated "In my opinion, there's only one person I believe could play Louis today. John Travolta. He has the rhythm, he's an Italian, and he has that devilish twinkle in his eye. The only thing he has to learn is the New Orleans flavor, and I know he could do that."

In 2004, Maione was inducted into the Toms River Schools Hall of Fame.

Maione died in Pensacola, Florida, at the age of 72.

Until her death in 2013, Maione operated Prima Music, LLC, which releases previously unavailable Prima titles. The company also operates www.louisprima.com. She also stated that she had been interested in developing a Prima biopic.
