= Michael Aldred =

British record producer (1945–1995)

Michael Theodore Montague Aldred
- Born: 6 July 1945
- Died: 15 April 1995 (aged 49); St John's Wood, City of Westminster, London
- Occupations: Music producer, music journalist

Michael Aldred (6 July 1945 – 15 April 1995) was a British record producer, music journalist, and television presenter. He is best remembered as co-presenter of the 1960s music show Ready Steady Go!.

== Life and career ==
Aldred attended Emanuel School in Battersea, London, from 1956 to 1963. While still at school, he took a Saturday job in the record department of WHSmith at Putney in 1963. While there he successfully submitted several articles to the short-lived magazine Jazz News and Review. He secured an interview with Sarah Vaughan for the school magazine during her 1963 tour with Count Basie. In the summer of the same year, his interview with Oscar Brown Jr for Crescendo magazine was published in the August 1963 issue.

In October 1963, Aldred auditioned for the role of 'teenage adviser' in a pop music series for Rediffusion entitled Ready Steady Go, which had been running since August and presented by Keith Fordyce. It was about to be broadcast across the ITV network, and producer Elkan Allan was keen to differentiate its style from similar BBC productions which had been fronted by presenters visibly older than the target audience. Other auditionees included Anne Nightingale and Cathy McGowan. Fordyce and Allan decided to select Aldred and McGowan. At the time of his debut, Aldred was aged 18 years and 5 months, by some margin the youngest presenter of any programme on British television. He remained with the programme for six months, after which McGowan was promoted to co-presenter with Fordyce. During 1964, he made a guest appearance as a panellist on Associated Television’s Thank Your Lucky Stars.

Aldred returned to music journalism, contributing to a number of pop magazines of the time. Some of these articles were written under his own name and others under pseudonyms, one of which was 'Gary Glitter'. Paul Gadd, a runner on Ready Steady Go, later appropriated it as his own stage name. Aldred's other work included an article entitled "Why I'd Send A Valentine to Marianne Faithfull" for Fabulous magazine in 1965. Despite the article's sentiments, Aldred was gay – and according to a number of writers, had brief affairs with Dave Davies of the Kinks and Andrew Loog Oldham, manager of the Rolling Stones, whom he had met through Brian Jones. He wrote the liner notes for the Kinks' LP The Kink Kontroversy, released November 1965.

In October 1966, Aldred made an unsuccessful attempt at a recording career of his own with Pye Records, recording "Just Around the Corner" with "Don't Make Promises" on the flip side. He then moved into music production, his relative youth in what was already a youthful industry earning him the nickname 'Teenage' Aldred. His work included recordings for Billie Davis (for whom he also wrote some songs) and Wayne Fontana, with whom in 1970 he recorded a demo version of "Give Me Just A Little More Time" for Philips. However, they were beaten to the release by the version by Chairmen of the Board which went to No. 3 in the charts. He also produced a number of singles for Timebox and Alan Merrill.

In the mid-1970s, Aldred moved to the United States where he continued in music production and writing, acting as reviewer for magazines such as Goldmine and Audio. Amongst his work at this time was a substantial article on the recording technique of Phil Spector which was run across two editions of Goldmine in 1988. He returned to one of his first loves in 1991, compiling a Sarah Vaughan album from her years with Roulette Records.

== Death ==
Aldred contracted HIV during the 1980s. He died in Westminster, London, on 15 April 1995.
