= Irving Kahal =

American lyricist (1903–1942)

- Born: March 5, 1903; Houtzdale, Pennsylvania
- Died: February 7, 1942 (aged 38); New York City
- Occupation: Lyricist

Irving Kahal (March 5, 1903, Houtzdale, Pennsylvania – February 7, 1942, New York City, New York) was an American song lyricist active in the 1920s and 1930s. He is best remembered for his collaborations with composer Sammy Fain, which started in 1926, when Kahal was working in vaudeville sketches written by Gus Edwards. Their collaboration lasted 16 years, until Kahal's death in 1942 of uremic poisoning.

Among many songs, a stand-out was "You Brought a New Kind of Love to Me," on which Pierre Norman lent a hand, and which was sung by Maurice Chevalier in the film The Big Pond (1930). It effectively became his signature tune, and was featured by Frank Sinatra on his album Songs For Swingin' Lovers.

The Fain/Kahal catalogue also includes "Let a Smile Be Your Umbrella" (1928) with Francis Wheeler; "Wedding Bells Are Breaking Up That Old Gang of Mine" (1929) with Willie Raskin; "By a Waterfall" (1930); "When I Take My Sugar to Tea" (1931) with Pierre Norman; "I Can Dream, Can't I?" (1938); and "I'll Be Seeing You", which was written in 1938, but became a hit in 1943 (after Kahal's death), especially among the families of servicemen sent overseas.

In 1970, Irving Kahal was inducted posthumously into the Songwriters Hall of Fame.
