= Louis Prima =

American musician (1910–1978)

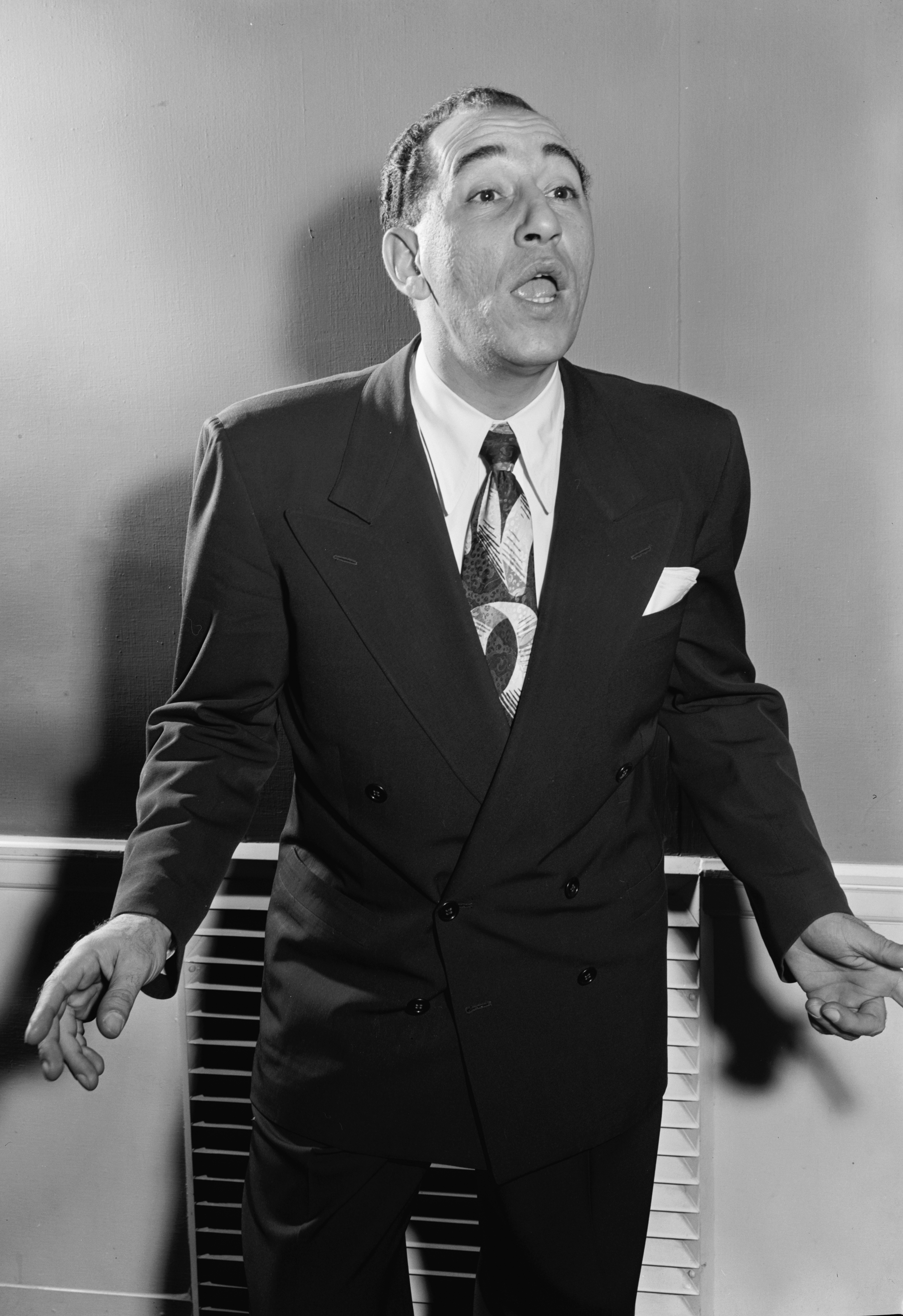
- Prima in 1947

Background information
- Also known as: The King of Swing
- Born: Louis Leo Prima; December 7, 1910; New Orleans, Louisiana, U.S.
- Died: August 24, 1978 (aged 67) New Orleans, Louisiana, U.S.
- Genres: Jazz; swing; traditional pop; jump blues; big band
- Occupations: Musician; entertainer; bandleader
- Instruments: Vocals; trumpet
- Years active: 1929–1975
- Labels: Capitol, Dot
- Spouses: Louise Polizzi (m. 1929; div. 1936) Alma Ross (m. 1936; div. 1945) Tracelene Barrett (m. 1945; div. 1952) Keely Smith (m. 1953; div. 1961) Gia Maione (m. 1963)
- Website: www.louisprima.com

Louis Leo Prima (/ˈluːi ˈpriːmə/; December 7, 1910 – August 24, 1978) was an American trumpeter, singer, entertainer, and bandleader. While rooted in New Orleans jazz, swing music, and jump blues, Prima touched on various genres throughout his career: he formed a seven-piece New Orleans–style jazz band in the late 1920s, fronted a swing combo in the 1930s and a big band group in the 1940s, helped to popularize jump blues in the late 1940s and early to mid 1950s, and performed frequently as a Vegas lounge act beginning in the 1950s.

From the 1940s through the 1960s, his music further encompassed early R&B and rock 'n' roll, boogie-woogie, and Italian folk music, such as the tarantella. Prima made prominent use of Italian music and language in his songs, blending elements of his Italian and Sicilian identity with jazz and swing music. At a time when ethnic musicians were discouraged from openly stressing their ethnicity, Prima's conspicuous embrace of his Sicilian ethnicity opened the doors for other Italian-American and ethnic American musicians to display their ethnic roots.

Prima is also known for providing the voice for the orangutan King Louie in the 1967 Disney film The Jungle Book.

== Early life ==
Louis Leo Prima was from a musical Italian American family in New Orleans, Louisiana. His father, Anthony Prima, was the son of Leonardo Di Prima, a Sicilian immigrant from Salaparuta, while his mother, Angelina Caravella, had emigrated from the island of Ustica north of Sicily as a baby. Prima was the second child of four; his older brother, Leon, was born in 1907, while his sisters Elizabeth and Marguerite were younger. Marguerite died when she was three years old. Leon, Louis, and Elizabeth were all baptized at St. Ann's Parish. They lived in a house at 1812 St. Peter Street in New Orleans.

Prima's mother was a music lover, and she made sure that each child played an instrument. Louis was assigned the violin and started out playing at St. Ann's Parish. He became interested in jazz when he heard black musicians, including Louis Armstrong. Italian immigrants, Italian-Americans, and African-Americans in New Orleans at the time frequently socialized together in the same clubs and bars. Local clubs tailored to the ostracized Italian community, such as Matranga's, Joe Segrettas, Tonti's Social Club, and Lala's Big 25, were all Italian-American clubs owned and operated by Italians; African Americans were always welcomed in these clubs and often played music and fraternized with Italians and Italian-Americans. Prima's interest in jazz was sparked while frequenting these clubs and observing black and Italian jazz artists playing together.

According to author Garry Boulard in his book Louis Prima, Prima paid attention to the music coming from clubs and watched his older brother Leon play the cornet. When Leon left the house to spend one summer in Texas, Prima practiced continuously on his worn-down cornet. He formed a band in 1924 with his childhood friends "Candy" Candido (bass), Irving Fazola (clarinet) and Johnny Viviano (drums).

Prima attended Jesuit High School but transferred to Warren Easton High, then a boys' school, in the fall of 1926. At Warren Easton, he played with the "Eastonites", the school band. In 1927, he partnered with fellow musician Frank Federico and the pair played at "The Whip", a run-down French Quarter nightclub. By the spring of 1928, Prima decided he would become a professional musician.

== Career ==
After finishing high school in New Orleans, Prima had a few unsuccessful gigs, including when he joined the Ellis Stratakos Orchestra in 1929. Prima, Federico and saxophonist Dave Winstein drove to Florida for a gig but no one showed up. They made it to a relative's house, where they were given money for gas and a meal. Prima did not give up. He joined Joseph Cherniavsky's Orchestra in 1929 at Jefferson Parish. He got a temporary job playing on the steamship Capital that docked on Canal Street.

Although the Capital did not provide him with a big break for his career, he did meet his first wife Louise Polizzi there. They married on June 25, 1929. From 1931 to 1932, Prima occupied his time by performing in the Avalon Club owned by his brother Leon. His first break was when Lou Forbes hired him for daily afternoon and early evening shows at The Saenger.

=== New York City ===
New York was an attraction for hungry musicians during the Great Depression. Guy Lombardo met Prima while he was performing at club Shim Sham during the Mardi Gras season of 1934.

=== Prima and his New Orleans Gang ===
In September 1934, Prima began recording for the Brunswick label. He recorded "That's Where the South Begins", "Long About Midnight", "Jamaica Shout", and "Star Dust".

Prima and his New Orleans Gang featured Frank Pinero playing piano, Jack Ryan on bass, Garrett McAdams on guitar, and Pee Wee Russell on clarinet. The band had their first performance at a club called the Famous Door, owned and operated by Jack Colt. Prima's recordings from 1935 were a combination of Dixieland and swing. In May 1935, Prima and Russell recorded "The Lady in Red", a national jukebox hit. They also recorded "Chinatown", "Chasing Shadows" and "Gypsy Tea Room".

Martha Raye played a role in Prima's professional and personal life. She was a comedian with potential to become a singer. The two featured a show at the club that granted Prima his first national debut on "The Fleischman Hour". In March 1936, Prima wrote and recorded "Sing Sing Sing", which subsequently became a hit for Benny Goodman.

=== California ===
Prima moved to California to expand his music. During this time there was a movement for big bands and orchestras. Prima hired Louis "Sherman" Masinter on the string bass, a New Orleans native. He fired McAdams so that he could have Frank Federico, his childhood friend, play the guitar.

With all of his success, his marriage back in New Orleans had already failed. He and Louise were divorced in 1936, following infidelities going back at least to the French Quarter in 1933.

A few months later, he was involved in a new fling with Alma Ross, an actress. Prima and Ross were quite serious and after only a few months together he asked her to marry him while he started his tour out in the Midwest. The couple faced problems in Wisconsin and Chicago because they did not meet the marital requirements. Guy Lombardo helped them out by arranging a place in South Bend, Indiana. They wed on July 25, 1936. The couple had a few problems; one of the worst was that Louis denied much about his past. He never confessed to Alma that he had a daughter until she found out from a tax return. Prima also pushed Ross into signing with Paramount in 1937.

He continued to travel along the East Coast with his band. Prima struggled to upgrade to big band style. It was not supported by his mentors in New York or Los Angeles. With the help of Guy Lombardo he traveled to Chicago to promote his new format at the Blackhawk in October 1936. The new format was unsuccessful.

=== Reinvented in New York ===
In 1937, Prima and his smaller gang (Federico, Masinter, Pinero, and Meyer Weinberg on clarinet) returned to the Famous Door in New York to perform. He also appeared at Billy Rose's Casa Mañana club in May 1938. He earned nearly a quarter million dollars throughout seven weeks at Casa Mañana.

He was booked by William Morris Agency in late 1938, which sent him to Boston, New York, Baltimore, Washington, D.C., Philadelphia, Miami Beach, New Orleans, and St. Louis. The band traveled by car, since it was the cheapest option.

=== World War II ===
In 1939, Prima was under contract to appear in Black theatres in New York, Baltimore, Boston and Washington D.C. First Lady Eleanor Roosevelt attended his performance in Washington D.C., and formally invited him to President Franklin D. Roosevelt's birthday celebration. He appeared in photographs with the President, which ultimately boosted his publicity. Deemed unfit for military service in World War II because of a knee injury, Prima continued performing.

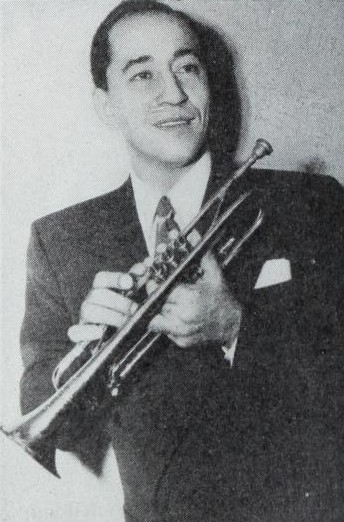
Prima and his trumpet, c. 1947

By the mid-1940s, Prima was experiencing great success. People were purchasing tickets early in the morning for shows later on that evening. Despite the anti-Italian sentiment during the war, Prima continued to record Italian songs, the most famous being "Angelina", named after his mother. Others included "Please No Squeeza Da Banana", "Baciagaloop (Makes Love on the Stoop)", and "Felicia No Capicia".

He performed the Italian songs at the Strand Theatre in New York. He brought in $440,000 in six weeks. In Detroit he could bring in about $38,000 for an afternoon performance. With all of this success, he decided to go back to Chicago to prove himself; he sold out the "Panther Room" in that city.

Prima had several big hits in the summer of 1945, including "My Dreams Are Getting Better All the Time" and "Bell-Bottom Trousers". As his career grew, however, his marriage with Alma simultaneously failed. They got a divorce when she discovered he had been cheating on her with another actress. Alma was supposed to receive $15,000 a year or 7.5% of his earnings. Prima ignored the payments until they piled up to about $60,000, which forced him to write a settlement check of $45,000 plus $250 per week. Later he married his secretary, Tracelene Barrett.

By the end of the war years, the popularity of big band music was diminishing, and by 1947 Prima was playing more jazzy versions of his music. Under a new contract with RCA Victor, he recorded "Civilization"; "You Can't Tell the Depth of the Well"; "Say it with a Slap"; "Valencia"; "My Flame Went Out Last Night"; "Thousand Islands"; "Mean To Me"; and "Tutti Tutti Pizzicato".

In 1948, Prima and Barrett had a baby girl.

=== Personality ===
Fans knew Prima as a genial and patient celebrity: he always signed autographs or posed for pictures with a smile. To the record companies and big corporations, however, Prima showed little deference, and he was uncompromising in seeking maximum compensation for his work.

Warner Brothers offered him $60,000 to be in a movie based on the life of Helen Morgan, but he rejected it; when the studio increased the offer to $75,000, it was still not enough. Prima wanted $100,000 and creative control of his role, which was rejected by Warner Brothers. He had protracted disputes with the Strand Theatre in New York City and Majestic Records, and he flatly refused to allow a former songwriter to advertise herself as "formerly featured with Louis Prima's orchestra".

Prima had expensive tastes: he shopped at luxury clothing stores and always wore top-brand suits. He spent great sums on horse racing and his own private stable of horses. He said he enjoyed gambling because it relaxed him; riding was another one of the things that relaxed him the most outside of his busy performing life. He knew each of his horses well and read about training. Another hobby was boating. He purchased a boat for his third wife Tracelene Barrett for their honeymoon on the Hudson River.

=== Keely Smith ===
Keely Smith was twenty when she met Prima in August 1948. Born in Norfolk, Virginia, she made a point to stop by the Surf Club in Virginia Beach to visit him. To her surprise, Prima was looking for a new female vocalist to replace Lily Ann Carol. Smith was wearing a bathing suit and was not allowed into the club until she put on proper attire. Luckily, someone was able to lend her some acceptable clothing and she auditioned. She landed the part and was soon traveling with his band.

Prima signed with Columbia Records in the fall of 1951 to keep up with the rapid changes in the marketing industry. Throughout his sixteen-month contract, his top hits consisted of "Chop Suey, Chow Mein", "Ooh-Dahdily-Dah", and "Chili Sauce". To support his horses and manage his expenses, he chose to drop his big band and play in lesser clubs. On top of it all, he divorced his third wife Tracelene on June 18, 1953. Less than a month later he married Keely. She was open to criticism, and he wanted to make her a star. He tried to find the style that fit her correctly, especially since rock and roll was emerging. Prima was not against rock 'n' roll like some other artists, such as Frank Sinatra and Jackie Gleason. He accepted that "the kids had an instinct for the kind of music that's fun to listen to and dance to."

=== A new act ===
In 1954, Prima was offered a stay at The Sahara in Las Vegas to open his new act with Keely Smith. He enlisted New Orleans saxophonist Sam Butera and his backing musicians, The Witnesses. The act was a hit, and ultimately led Prima to sign with Capitol Records in 1955. The act performed regularly in Las Vegas for the rest of the decade.

He released his first album with Capitol Records, The Wildest!, in September 1956. Some of the popular songs include his medley of "Just a Gigolo" and "I Ain't Got Nobody". In 1957, the couple released The Call of the Wildest.

Keely worked with other artists to release the album I Wish You Love, and received a Grammy for it in 1958. She earned Billboard and Variety's number one female vocalist award in 1958–59, and the Playboy Jazz Award in 1959. The duo also redid "That Old Black Magic", which was a Top 40 hit for two months. It earned the duo a Grammy. The couple also had two daughters together, one of whom, Toni, became an actress and singer in her own right.

Prima decided to relocate his acts to the Desert Inn because he would take in $3 million for producing twelve weeks' worth of acts a year for five years.

Prima signed with Dot Records in 1959 and produced eight albums, headlined by Wonderland By Night and On Stage in 1961. The couple was constantly performing and it affected their marriage. An attempted vacation boating down the Atlantic coast ended up grounded in the Intracoastal Waterway until rescued by the Coast Guard.

In January 1961, Prima was invited by Frank Sinatra to perform at the inaugural gala for President John F. Kennedy; the two played "Old Black Magic" together.

The constant performances and Prima's infidelities were too much for Smith. That noted, Smith also had an affair with Frank Sinatra, prior to her divorce from Prima in 1961. After finishing up their contract at the Desert Inn, she filed for divorce at the Eighth Judicial Circuit Court of Nevada in Las Vegas.

After Smith was out of his life and his performances, Prima tried to prove that he did not need her. In the New York Post there was a suggestion that Smith should rejoin for an act in New York's Basin Street East nightclub. Prima said "I have no desire whatsoever to have any dealings with Keely Smith under any conditions… There is nothing in the world or no one that could ever make me accept this woman in our act."

Prima's father died in 1961, the same year as the divorce from Smith. His mother died in the winter of 1965.

In 1962, he tried to form his own recording company called Prima One Records. He filled Smith's spot with Gia Maione, a waitress who was 21 years old. He did his best to make her famous by producing her first album "This Is … Gia". It was funded entirely by him, and it was unsuccessful. They married and had a daughter, Lena, later a New Orleans–based singer and recording artist with Basin Street Records, and his only son, Louis Prima Jr., the last of his six children. He was also in the middle of making appearances in Las Vegas and promoting the film Twist All Night.

In 1967, Prima landed a role in Walt Disney's animated feature The Jungle Book, as the raucous orangutan King Louie. He performed the hit song "I Wan'na Be like You" on the soundtrack, leading to the recording of two albums with Phil Harris: The Jungle Book and More Jungle Book, and covering MC duties and singing the theme song "Winnie the Pooh", for the 1967 album titled Happy Birthday Winnie the Pooh, all of these on Disneyland Records. He can be heard on the soundtrack of another cartoon feature, The Man Called Flintstone.

== Personal life and death ==
Prima was married five times and had six children. Prima was married to Louise Polizzi from 1929 to 1936; Alma Ross from 1936 to 1945; Tracelene Barrett from 1945 to 1952; Keely Smith from 1953 to 1961; and Gia Maione in 1963. All but his marriage to Maione ended in divorce.

Among his children are musical performers Lena Prima and Louis Prima Jr., both born to Maione.

In 1973, Prima suffered a heart attack. Two years later, following headaches and episodes of memory loss, he sought medical attention, and was diagnosed with a brain stem tumor. Following surgery, he suffered a cerebral hemorrhage and went into a coma. He never recovered and he died in 1978, having been moved back to New Orleans. He was buried in Metairie Cemetery in a gray marble crypt topped by a figure of Gabriel, the trumpeter-angel, sculpted by Russian-born sculptor Alexei Kazantsev.

== Legacy ==
At a time when ethnic musicians were discouraged from openly stressing their ethnicity, Prima's conspicuous embrace of his Sicilian ethnicity opened the doors for other Italian-American and ethnic American musicians to display their ethnic roots.

Prima's expected visit to a small Italian restaurant drives the plot of the critically acclaimed 1996 film Big Night.

His rendition of "Pennies from Heaven" was featured in the 2003 Christmas blockbuster Elf.

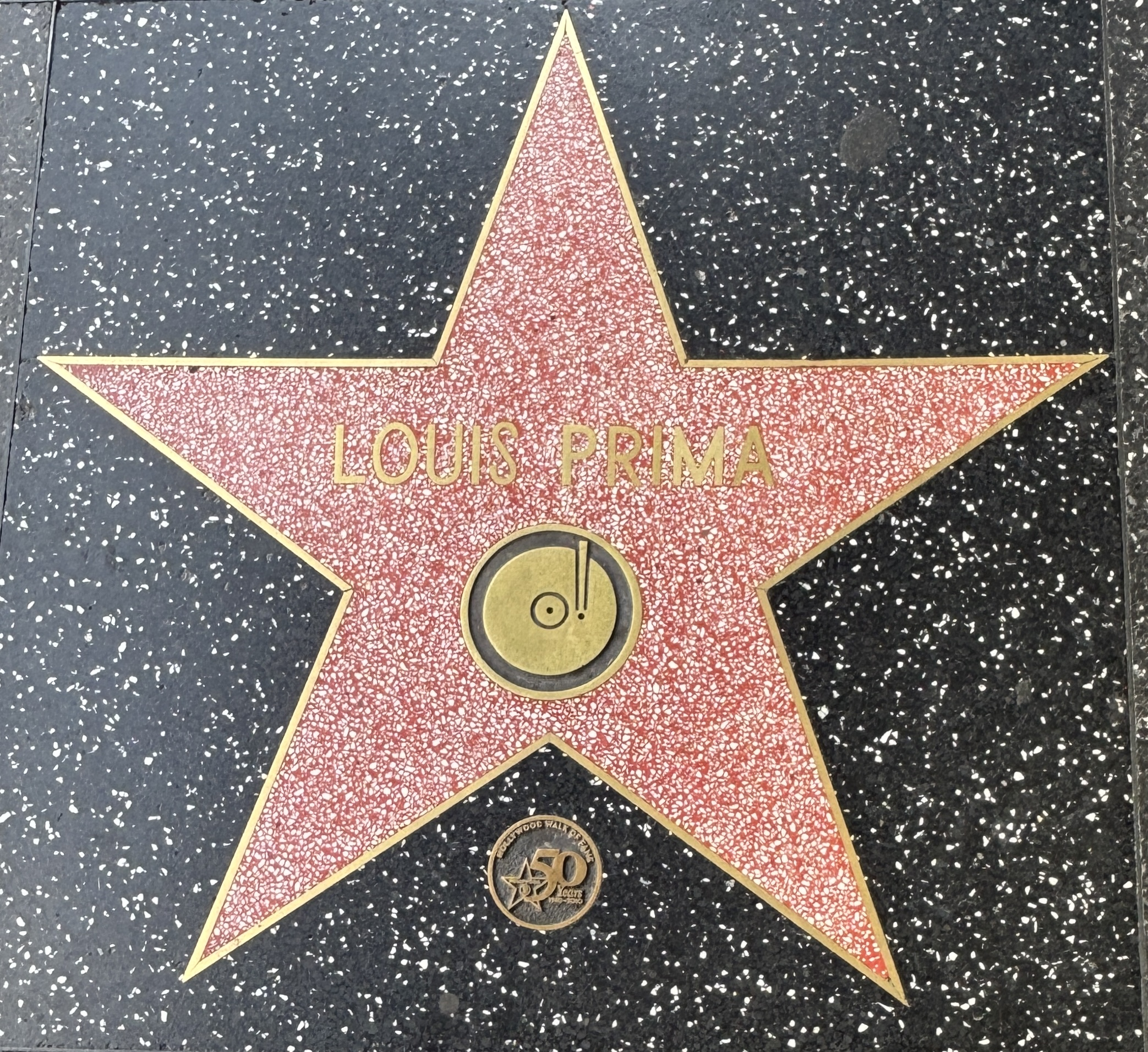
Hollywood Walk of Fame star

On July 25, 2010, the centenary year of his birth, Prima received a star on the Hollywood Walk of Fame.

In 2018, Prima's 1936 single "What Will Santa Claus Say (When He Finds Everybody Swingin')" was sampled by Kids See Ghosts on the song "4th Dimension", which appeared on their album Kids See Ghosts.

Prima's New Orleans–based daughter, Lena Prima, performs throughout the country. His son, Louis Prima Jr. leads his own band.

== Filmography ==
Film
Year	Title	Role	Notes
1936	Rhythm on the Range	Trumpet Player	Uncredited
1937	You Can't Have Everything	Orchestra Leader	
1937	Manhattan Merry-Go-Round	Bandleader	Uncredited
1938	Start Cheering	Himself – Conductor of his Band	
1939	Rose of Washington Square	Band Leader	
1958	Senior Prom	Himself	
1959	Hey Boy! Hey Girl!	Himself	
1961	The Continental Twist	Louis Evans	
1967	The Jungle Book	King Louie	Voice
1975	Rafferty and the Gold Dust Twins	Himself	(final film role)

== Discography ==
=== Albums ===
- Louis Prima Plays for the People (Mercury MG-25142, 1953)
- The Wildest! (Capitol T-755, 1956)
- The Call of the Wildest (Capitol T-836, 1957)
- The Wildest Show at Tahoe (Capitol T-908, 1957)
- Las Vegas Prima Style (Capitol T-1010, 1958)
- Strictly Prima! (Capitol T-1132, 1958)
- Breaking It Up! (Columbia CL-1206, 1958)
- Hey Boy!, Hey Girl! (Capitol T-1160, 1959)
- Louis and Keely! (Dot DLP-3210/25210, 1959)
- His Greatest Hits (Dot DLP-3262/25262, 1960)
- Together (Dot DLP-3263/25263, 1960)
- Pretty Music – Prima Style: Volume One (Dot DLP-3264/25264, 1960)
- On Stage (Dot DLP-3266/25266, 1960)
- Wonderland by Night: Pretty Music – Prima Style Volume II (Dot DLP-3352/25352, 1960)
- Blue Moon (Dot DLP-3385/25385, 1961)
- Return of the Wildest (Dot DLP-3392/25392, 1961)
- Doin' the Twist With Louis Prima (Dot DLP-3410/25410, 1961)
- The Hits of Louis and Keely (Capitol T/ST-1531, 1961)
- The Wildest Comes Home! (Capitol T/ST-1723, 1962)
- Lake Tahoe Prima Style (Capitol T/ST-1797, 1962)
- Prima Show in the Casbar (Prima Magnagroove PM/PS-3001, 1963)
- The King of Clubs (Prima Magnagroove PM/PS-3003, 1964)
- Let’s Fly With Mary Poppins (Buena Vista BV/STER-3333, 1965)
- That Darn Cat (Buena Vista BV/STER-3334, 1965)
- The Golden Hits of Louis Prima (Hanna-Barbera HLP-8502/HST-9502, 1966)
- Louis Prima on Broadway (United Artists UAL-3596/UAS-6596, 1967)
- The Jungle Book: Original Cast Soundtrack (Disneyland BV/STER-4041, 1967)
- The New Sounds of the Louis Prima Show (De-Lite DE-2001, 1968)
- More Jungle Book: Further Adventures of Baloo and Mowgli (Disneyland ST/STER-3960, 1969)
- Blast Off: The Live New Sound of Louis Prima (Prima Magnagroove ST-0030, 1970)
- The Prima Generation '72 (Prima Magnagroove ST-0072, 1972)
- Just a Gigolo (Prima Magnagroove ST-0073, 1973)
- Angelina (Prima Magnagroove ST-0074, 1973)
- Let’s "Hear" It for Robin Hood (Buena Vista 3339, 1974)
- The Wildest '75 (Prima Magnagroove ST-0076, 1975)

=== Selected singles ===
- "Dinah" / "Chinatown, My Chinatown" (1933) Bluebird
- "That's Where the South Begins" / "Jamaica Shout" (1934) Brunswick
- "Long About Midnight" / "Stardust" (1934) Brunswick
- "Sing it Way Down Low" / "Let's Have a Jubilee" (1934) Brunswick
- "I Still Want You" / "Breakin' the Ice" (1934) Brunswick
- "House Rent Party" / "Bright Eyes" (1935) Brunswick
- "It's the Rhythm in Me" / "Worry Blues" (1935) Brunswick
- "Angelina" (1944) Hit
- "Hi Ho Trailus Bootwhip" / "I'll Walk Alone" (1945) Mercury
- "Marguerita" (1947) Majestic
- "I Beeped When I Shoulda Bopped" / "The Manuelo Tarantel" (1949) Mercury
- "Luigi (song)" / "Oh, Marie" (1953) Styrene
- "Buona Sera" (1956)
- "Jump, Jive an' Wail" (1956)

== See also ==
- Italians in New Orleans
- Sing, Sing, Sing (With a Swing)
