= Susan Hayward filmography =

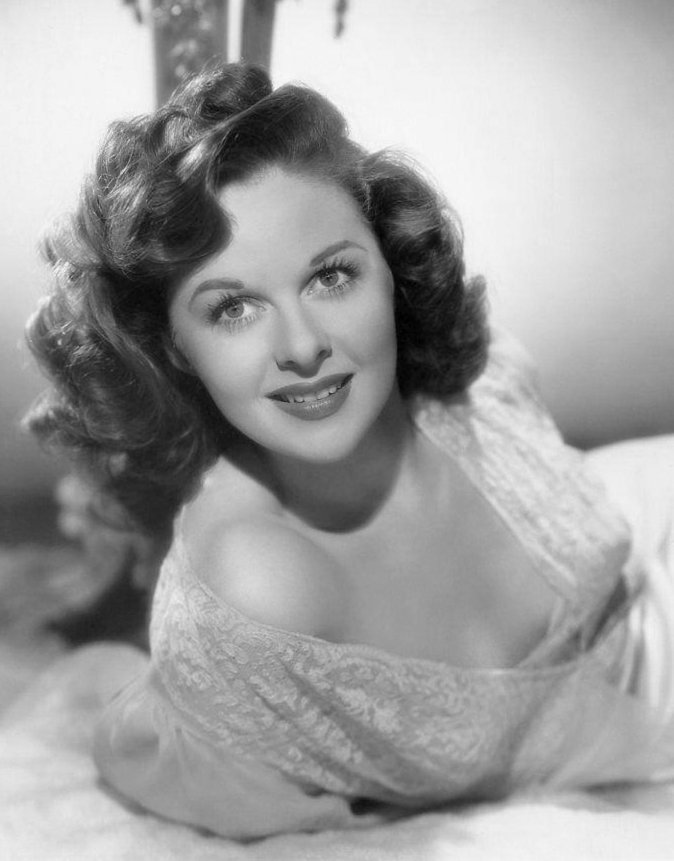
Hayward in 1944

Susan Hayward (June 30, 1917 – March 14, 1975) was an American actress. She first traveled to Hollywood to audition for Scarlett O'Hara in Gone with the Wind, but did not get the part. Making her film debut in 1937's romantic musical comedy Hollywood Hotel, she had uncredited roles in several more films until she got her first moderately important role in Girls on Probation (1938) for Warner Bros. Her first leading role came when she starred as Isobel in Beau Geste (1939), and she began to land larger roles in films such as Our Leading Citizen (1939), Among the Living (1941), and Reap the Wild Wind (1942), all of which she made for Paramount Pictures.

After acting in several films for United Artists, she signed a seven-year contract with Walter Wanger and reached stardom for her portrayal of Angie Evans in Stuart Heisler's drama Smash-Up, the Story of a Woman (1947), which earned her her first of five nominations for the Academy Award for Best Actress. She was nominated again in 1949, for the romantic drama My Foolish Heart.

Switching to 20th Century Fox in the late 1940s, she starred in several successful films such as I'd Climb the Highest Mountain, David and Bathsheba (both 1951), and The Snows of Kilimanjaro (1952). Also in 1952, she played Jane Froman in the biographical musical drama With a Song in My Heart, earning her third Oscar nomination and a Golden Globe Award for Best Actress in a Leading Role – Musical or Comedy. She earned her fourth nomination for her performance as alcoholic showgirl and actress Lillian Roth in the biopic I'll Cry Tomorrow. Though the award ultimately went to Anna Magnani for The Rose Tattoo, Hayward won Best Actress at the 1956 Cannes Film Festival. In 1956, she played Bortai alongside John Wayne in The Conqueror, which was a commercial success but a critical failure, and is widely considered to be one of the worst films of all time.

In 1958, Hayward played death row inmate Barbara Graham in Robert Wise's film noir I Want to Live!, which succeeded both critically and commercially. Hayward's performance was heavily praised by critics, with some considering it the best Hollywood performance by an actress of all time. She won the Academy Award for Best Actress, as well as the Golden Globe Award for Best Actress in a Motion Picture – Drama. She also received 37% of the film's net profits. The New York Times journalist Bosley Crowther hailed her performance as "so vivid and so shattering ... Anyone who could sit through this ordeal without shivering and shuddering is made of stone."

As her career began to decline, she starred in several unsuccessful films such as Ada (1961), I Thank a Fool (1962), Stolen Hours (1963), and Where Love Has Gone (1964), the latter of which co-starred Bette Davis. In 1967, she acted in The Honey Pot and replaced Judy Garland in Valley of the Dolls, based on Jacqueline Susann's 1966 novel of the same name. The film was panned by critics but was a box office success. She then made her stage debut as the titular character in the Las Vegas production of the musical Mame at Caesars Palace, which she acted in from December 1968 to March 1969.

Hayward's doctor found a lung tumor in 1972, which later metastasized. She was diagnosed with brain cancer in 1973 following a seizure and made her final film appearance in the made-for-television drama Say Goodbye, Maggie Cole (1972). She succumbed to her illness on March 14, 1975.

== Filmography ==
=== Film ===
Year	Title	Role	Notes	Ref
1937	Hollywood Hotel	Starlet at table	Uncredited	
1938	The Amazing Dr. Clitterhouse	Patient	Scenes deleted	
1938	The Sisters	Telephone operator	Uncredited	
1938	Girls on Probation	Gloria Adams		
1938	Comet Over Broadway	Amateur Actress	Uncredited	
1938	Campus Cinderella	Co-Ed	Short subject	
1939	Beau Geste	Isobel Rivers		
1939	Our Leading Citizen	Judith Schofield		
1939	$1,000 a Touchdown	Betty McGlen		
1941	Adam Had Four Sons	Hester Stoddard		
1941	Sis Hopkins	Carol Hopkins		
1941	Among the Living	Millie Pickens		
1942	Reap the Wild Wind	Drusilla Alston		
1942	The Forest Rangers	Tana "Butch" Mason		
1942	I Married a Witch	Estelle Masterson		
1942	Star Spangled Rhythm	Herself – Genevieve in Priorities Skit		
1942	A Letter from Bataan	Mrs. Mary Lewis	Short subject	
1943	Young and Willing	Kate Benson		
1943	Hit Parade of 1943	Jill Wright		
1943	Jack London	Charmian Kittredge		
1944	The Fighting Seabees	Constance Chesley		
1944	The Hairy Ape	Mildred Douglas		
1944	And Now Tomorrow	Janice Blair		
1944	Skirmish on the Home Front	Molly Miller	Short subject	
1946	Deadline at Dawn	June Goffe		
1946	Canyon Passage	Lucy Overmire		
1947	Smash-Up, the Story of a Woman	Angelica "Angie" / "Angel" Evans Conway		
1947	They Won't Believe Me	Verna Carlson		
1947	The Lost Moment	Tina Bordereau		
1948	Tap Roots	Morna Dabney		
1948	The Saxon Charm	Janet Busch		
1949	Tulsa	Cherokee Lansing		
1949	House of Strangers	Irene Bennett		
1949	My Foolish Heart	Eloise Winters		
1951	Screen Snapshots: Hopalong in Hoppy Land	Herself	Short subject	
1951	I'd Climb the Highest Mountain	Mary Elizabeth Eden Thompson		
1951	Rawhide	Vinnie Holt		
1951	I Can Get It for You Wholesale	Harriet Boyd		
1951	David and Bathsheba	Bathsheba		
1952	With a Song in My Heart	Jane Froman		
1952	The Snows of Kilimanjaro	Helen		
1952	The Lusty Men	Louise Merritt		
1953	The President's Lady	Rachel Donelson		
1953	White Witch Doctor	Ellen Burton		
1954	Demetrius and the Gladiators	Messalina		
1954	Garden of Evil	Leah Fuller		
1955	Untamed	Katie O'Neill (Kildare) (Van Riebeck)		
1955	Soldier of Fortune	Mrs. Jane Hoyt		
1955	I'll Cry Tomorrow	Lillian Roth		
1956	The Conqueror	Bortai		
1957	Top Secret Affair	Dorothy "Dottie" Peale		
1958	I Want to Live!	Barbara Graham		
1959	Thunder in the Sun	Gabrielle Dauphin		
1959	Woman Obsessed	Mary Sharron		
1961	The Marriage-Go-Round	Content Delville		
1961	Ada	Ada Gillis		
1961	Back Street	Rae Smith		
1962	I Thank a Fool	Christine Allison		
1963	Stolen Hours	Laura Pember	US title: 'Summer Flight'.	
1964	Where Love Has Gone	Valerie Hayden Miller		
1967	The Honey Pot	Mrs. Lone Star Crockett Sheridan		
1967	Valley of the Dolls	Helen Lawson		
1967	Think Twentieth	Herself		
1972	The Revengers	Elizabeth Reilly		

=== Television ===
Year	Title	Role	Notes	Ref.
1972	Heat of Anger	Jessie Fitzgerald	TV movie	
1972	Say Goodbye, Maggie Cole	Dr. Maggie Cole	TV movie	

=== Stage ===
Year(s)	Title	Role	Theater	Ref.
1968-69	Mame	Mame Dennis	Caesars Palace	

=== Radio ===
Year	Program	Episode/Source	Ref.
1938	Warner Bros. Academy Theater	"The Crowd Roars"	
1941	Lux Radio Theatre	"Hold Back The Dawn"	
1946	Duffy's Tavern	"Susan Hayward and Frank Buck"	
1946	Suspense	"Dame Fortune"	
1949	Bill Stern's Sports Reel	"Guest: Susan Hayward"	
1952	Lux Radio Theatre	"I Can Get It for You Wholesale"	
1952	Cavalcade of America	"Breakfast at Nancy's"	

== Awards and nominations ==
=== Academy Awards ===
Year	Category	Nominated work	Result	Ref.
1947	Best Actress	Smash-Up, the Story of a Woman	Nominated	
1949	Best Actress	My Foolish Heart	Nominated	
1952	Best Actress	With a Song in My Heart	Nominated	
1955	Best Actress	I'll Cry Tomorrow	Nominated	
1958	Best Actress	I Want to Live!	Won	

=== BAFTA Awards ===
Year	Category	Nominated work	Result	Ref.
1957	Best Foreign Actress	I'll Cry Tomorrow	Nominated	
1959	Best Foreign Actress	I Want to Live!	Nominated	

=== Cannes Film Festival Awards ===
Year	Category	Nominated work	Result	Ref.
1956	Best Actress	I'll Cry Tomorrow	Won	

=== David Di Donatello Awards ===
Year	Category	Nominated work	Result	Ref.
1959	Golden Plate	I Want to Live!	Won	

=== Golden Globe Awards ===
Year	Category	Nominated work	Result	Ref.
1953	Best Actress in a Leading Role – Musical or Comedy	With a Song in My Heart	Won	
1953	World Film Favorite	—	Won	
1959	Best Actress in a Motion Picture – Drama	I Want to Live!	Won	

=== Mar Del Plata International Film Festival Awards ===
Year	Category	Nominated work	Result	Ref.
1959	Best Actress	I Want to Live!	Won	

=== New York Film Critics Circle Awards ===
Year	Category	Nominated work	Result	Ref.
1958	Best Actress	I Want to Live!	Won	

=== Photoplay Awards ===
Year	Category	Nominated work	Result	Ref
1953	Gold Medal Award	With a Song in My Heart	Won	
