= Mike Connolly (columnist) =

American magazine reporter

- Born: Michael John Connolly; July 19, 1913; Chicago, Illinois
- Died: November 18, 1966 (aged 53); Rochester, Minnesota
- Occupation: American magazine reporter
- Known for: Hollywood columnist

Michael John Connolly (July 19, 1913 – November 18, 1966) was an American magazine reporter and primarily a Hollywood columnist.

== Early life and education ==
A native of Chicago, Illinois, he attended the University of Illinois at Urbana–Champaign, where, in 1937 and 1938, he was the city editor of the Daily Illini, the independent student-run newspaper.

== Career ==
From 1951 to 1966, Connolly was a gossip columnist for The Hollywood Reporter, a daily entertainment newspaper dealing with film and television productions, located in Los Angeles, California.

The screenplay for the biographical film I'll Cry Tomorrow (1955) was based on the autobiography of the same name by actress Lillian Roth, that was written in collaboration with Connolly and Gerold Frank.

He was described by Newsweek as "probably the most influential columnist inside the movie colony," the one writer "who gets the pick of trade items, the industry rumors, the policy and casting switches." Indeed, he was a witness to, and participant, in more than a decade of sometimes tumultuous Hollywood history, and he was privy to most of Hollywood's secrets during those years.

Actress and writer Shirley MacLaine devoted several pages in her first memoir, Don't Fall Off the Mountain (1970), to an incident in which she had marched into the offices of The Hollywood Reporter and punched Connolly in the mouth. She was angry about what he had said about her career in his column. The incident garnered a headline on the cover of the New York Post on June 11, 1963. The full story appeared on page 5 under the headline “Shirley Delivers A Punchy Line” with the byline of Bernard Lefkowitz, who later in the 1960s became an acclaimed author of non-fiction books.

== Personal life ==
Connolly was also known for his 1937–38 crusade against prostitution in Champaign, Illinois, and later for his battle against communism in Hollywood. According to his biographer, Val Holley, these campaigns were attempts by Connolly, who was a homosexual, to feel part of the mainstream. His sexual orientation was not made public until 37 years after his death.

=== Death ===
He died at the Mayo Clinic from a kidney malfunction following open-heart surgery on November 18, 1966.

== Biography ==
Holley, Val (2003). Mike Connolly and the Manly Art of Hollywood Gossip. Jefferson, North Carolina: McFarland & Company. ISBN 978-0-7864-1552-6.

== See also ==
- List of American print journalists
- List of people from Chicago
- List of people from Los Angeles
- List of University of Illinois at Urbana–Champaign people
