= Gerold Frank =

American author, ghostwriter (1907–1998)

- Born: August 2, 1907; Cleveland, Ohio, U.S.
- Died: September 17, 1998 (aged 91); Philadelphia, Pennsylvania, U.S.
- Education: Ohio State University
- Occupations: Writer; ghostwriter
- Spouse: Lilian Frank
- Children: 2
- Writing career
- Notable awards: Edgar Allan Poe Award for Best Fact Crime (x2)

Gerold Frank (August 2, 1907 – September 17, 1998) was an American writer and ghostwriter. He wrote several celebrity memoirs and was considered a pioneer of the "as told to" form of (auto)biography. His two best-known books, however, are The Boston Strangler (1966), which was adapted as the 1968 movie starring Tony Curtis and Henry Fonda, and An American Death (1972), about the assassination of Martin Luther King Jr.

== Life ==
Frank was born in 1907 in Cleveland, Ohio, where his father was a tailor and owned a dress shop. He graduated from Ohio State University and moved to Greenwich Village as an aspiring poet. Later he worked for a newspaper in Cleveland. He wrote some articles published by The New Yorker and The Nation and eventually returned to New York City, where he worked for Journal-American.

Frank wrote about the lives of Eastern European Jews before the Holocaust. In 1934 he made a film about life in a Polish shtetl, featuring the lives of his parents and his wife Lilian. It included rare scenes of the Warsaw Ghetto, which Frank donated to the Yivo Institute for Jewish Research.

Frank was a war correspondent in the Middle East during World War II, and he collaborated with Bartley Crum on a book about the Anglo-American Committee of Inquiry on Palestine, Behind the Silken Curtain: a Personal Account of Anglo-American Diplomacy in Palestine and the Middle East (Simon & Schuster, 1947).

He wrote a biography of Judy Garland entitled Judy (1975), considered by many to be the definitive book on Garland, and co-wrote Zsa Zsa Gabor's autobiography Zsa Zsa Gabor: My Story (1960). I'll Cry Tomorrow (1954), the autobiography of Lillian Roth, who co-wrote with Frank and columnist Mike Connolly, was an international bestseller, more than seven million copies in more than twenty languages. It was adapted as a 1955 movie by Frank among others and Susan Hayward was nominated for the Oscar in the starring role as Lillian Roth.

Frank won the annual "Best Fact Crime" Edgar Award from the Mystery Writers of America twice, for The Deed (1963), a book about the assassination of Lord Moyne, as well as for The Boston Strangler (1966).

According to Mr. Frank's son John, he wrote at least 17 books, including those as a ghostwriter without credit or with an acknowledgment alone.

Gerold and Lilian Frank had two children, a son and a daughter.

== Selected works ==
- Out in the Boondocks: marines in action in the Pacific; 21 U.S. marines tell their stories (G. P. Putnam's Sons, 1943), by James D. Horan and Frank
- U.S.S. Seawolf, submarine raider of the Pacific (Putnam, 1945), by Frank and James D. Horan with [Joseph Melvin] Eckberg
- I'll Cry Tomorrow (Frederick Fell, 1954), by Lillian Roth in collaboration with Mike Connolly and Frank
- Too Much, Too Soon (Henry Holt and Company, 1957), by Diana Barrymore and Frank — filmed in 1958
- Beloved Infidel: the education of a woman, by Sheilah Graham and Frank (Holt, 1958)
- Zsa Zsa Gábor: my story, written for me by Gerold Frank (Cleveland: World Publishing, 1960), with Zsa Zsa Gábor
- The Deed (Simon & Schuster, 1963) – about Lord Moyne, assassinated 1944
- Latin American mission; an adventure in hemisphere diplomacy (Simon & Schuster, 1965), ed. and introd. by Frank — about deLesseps S. Morrison, U.S. ambassador to OAS, 1961–63, autobiographical
- The Boston Strangler (New American Library, 1966)
- Judy (Harper & Row, 1975)
- An American Death: the true story of the assassination of Dr. Martin Luther King, Jr. and the greatest manhunt of our time (Doubleday, 1972) – about Martin Luther King Jr., assassinated 1968

=== Films adapted from his books ===
- I'll Cry Tomorrow (1955)
- Too Much, Too Soon (1958), or Too Much, Too Soon: The Daring Story of Diana Barrymore
- Beloved Infidel (1959)
- The Boston Strangler (1968)
