= This Is Your Life (American TV series) =

American television series

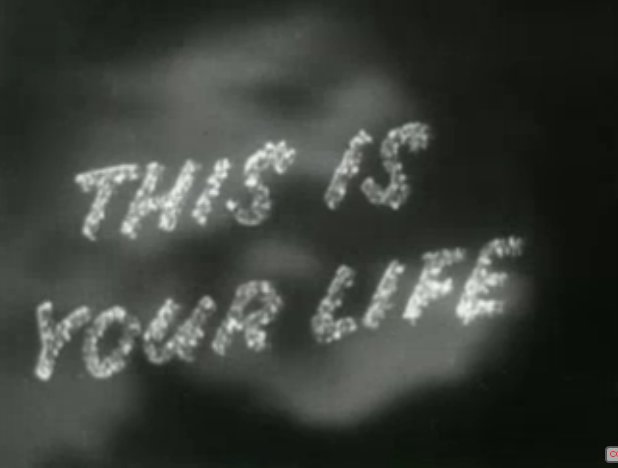
- Title card from 1954
- Genre: Reality; Documentary
- Presented by: Ralph Edwards
- Country of origin: United States
- Original language: English

Production
- Producer: Ralph Edwards
- Running time: 45–48 minutes

Original release
- Network: NBC
- Release: October 1, 1952 – 1961

Related
- British version Australian version New Zealand version

This Is Your Life is an American reality documentary series broadcast on NBC television from 1952 to 1961. It was originally hosted by its creator and producer Ralph Edwards as a radio program from 1948 to 1950. In the program, the host surprised guests and then took them through a retrospective of their lives in front of an audience, including appearances by colleagues, friends, and family. Edwards revived the show in 1971–1972, and Joseph Campanella hosted a version in 1983. Edwards returned for various specials in the late 1980s.

== Background ==
The idea for This Is Your Life arose while Ralph Edwards was hosting and producing the game show Truth or Consequences. He had been asked by the United States Army to "do something" for paraplegic soldiers at Birmingham General Army Hospital, a California Army rehabilitation hospital in Van Nuys, Los Angeles (a site later converted into a high school). Edwards chose a "particularly despondent young soldier and hit on the idea of presenting his life on the air, in order to integrate the wreckage of the present with his happier past and the promise of a hopeful future." Edwards received such positive public feedback from the "capsule narrative" of the soldier he gave on Truth or Consequences that he developed This Is Your Life as a radio show. In the show, Edwards surprised each guest by narrating a biography of the subject. The show "alternated in presenting the life stories of entertainment personalities and 'ordinary' people who had contributed in some way to their communities." The host, consulting his "red book", narrated while presenting the subject with family members, friends, and others who had affected his or her life.

== Notable guests ==
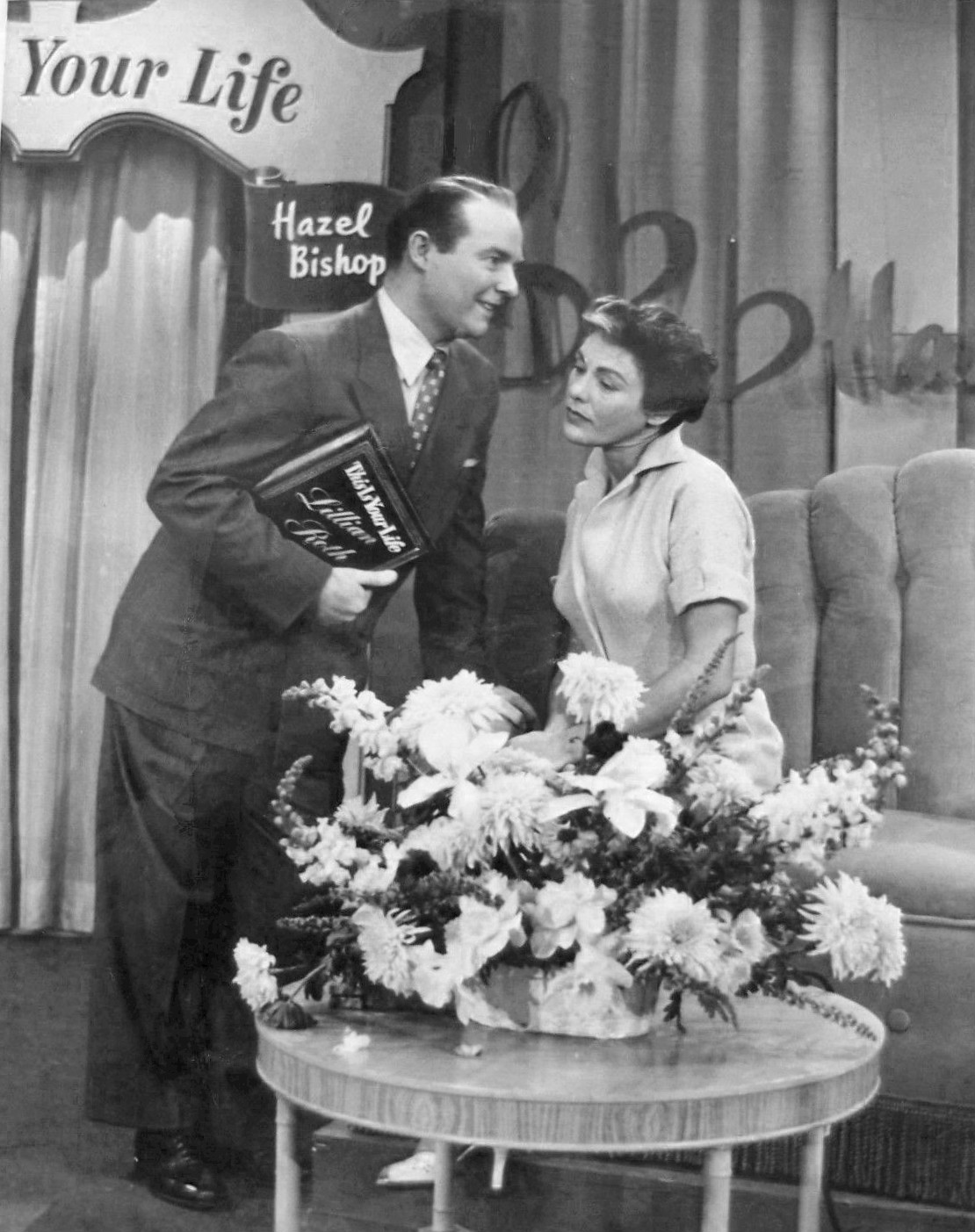
Ralph Edwards and Lillian Roth (1953)

One of the show's subjects was Reverend Kiyoshi Tanimoto, a survivor of the atomic bombing of Hiroshima. Believing he was there for a news interview, Tanimoto was instead met with a highly dramatized depiction of the events including sound effects, dramatic music, and actual footage of the city being destroyed in the bombing, and asked to walk viewers through what happened. During the episode Edwards introduced Tanimoto to Robert A. Lewis, the co-pilot of the Enola Gay, the plane that dropped the bomb on Hiroshima. The episode would later be described as "[exemplifying] a number of the ways in which America comes to terms with...its responsibility for Hiroshima. The first of these ways is Disneyfication, the tendency to view Hiroshima as a dramatic spectacle, an exercise in special effects: the ticking clock, the rolling kettledrums, and the image of the mushroom cloud produce an emotional frisson, and little more than that."

In February 1953, Lillian Roth, a "topflight torch singer of the Prohibition era" was the subject of the show, who "cheerfully admits that she had been a hopeless drunk for 16 years before being rescued by Alcoholics Anonymous." Edwards described Roth's condition as "impending blindness, an inflamed sinus, and a form of alcoholic insanity" and brought on a psychiatrist who had treated her, a brother-in-law "who had paid her bills", and several "glamorous foul-weather friends" such as Lita Grey Chaplin and Ruby Keeler. Roth's story became the basis of her 1954 autobiography and 1955 film adaption, I'll Cry Tomorrow, with Edwards appearing as himself.

Hanna Bloch Kohner, a Holocaust survivor, was the subject on May 27, 1953.

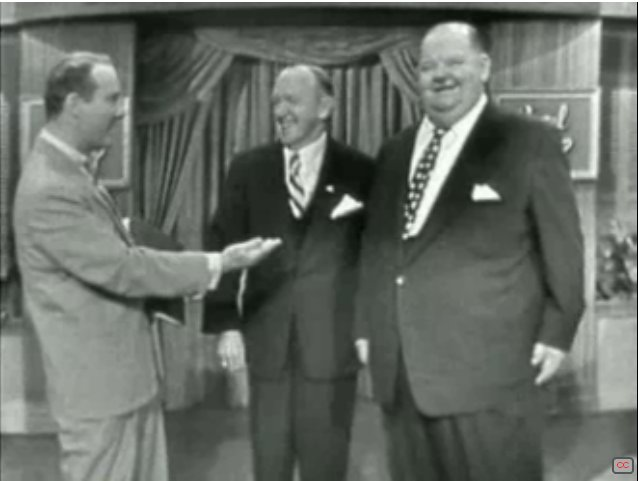
Stan Laurel and Oliver Hardy on the December 1, 1954 episode.

Kate Newcomb, a doctor who practiced in a "70-mile circle" around Woodruff, Wisconsin, was the subject of a 1954 episode, bringing attention to her "million pennies" drive to raise funds for a small community hospital; viewers of the episode donated more than $112,000 in pennies.

On December 1, 1954, This Is Your Life experimented with recounting two lives in the same half-hour program. Stan Laurel and Oliver Hardy were enjoying new popularity as their old movies were sweeping the country on television, but the men themselves had just retired from show business. The tribute began badly when the guests of honor didn't arrive on schedule (owing to a taxi breaking down) and host Ralph Edwards, on the air live, uncomfortably improvised alone as valuable minutes went by. Edwards managed to rush through the abbreviated tribute, but This Is Your Life never attempted a dual biography again; later episodes with Abbott and Costello and Olsen and Johnson focused on only one of the partners, with the other appearing near the end as a guest.

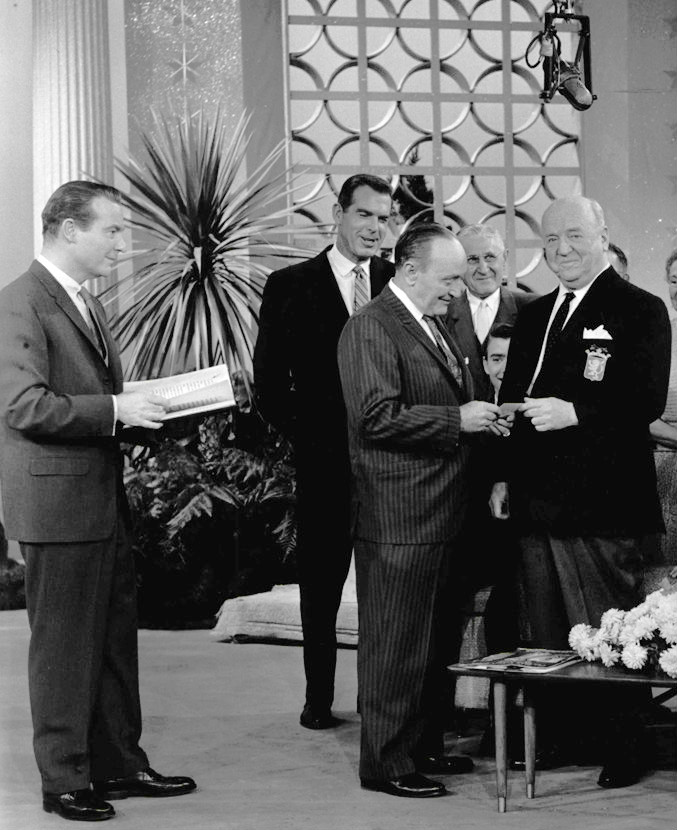
William Frawley receives a lifetime baseball pass from the Angels' Fred Haney in January 1961. Fred MacMurray also was part of the Frawley show.

The New York Times reported on September 1, 1955, that the Sixth United States Army requested a kinescope of the April 27 episode which honored World War II and Korean War General Mark Clark. The request stated, "We believe that showing of such a program would contribute materially toward the objectives of troop information, since it would create appreciation of the career of an outstanding military leader and further better understanding of certain highlights in the recent history of the Army."

According to The Complete Directory to Prime Time Network and Cable TV Shows 1946–Present, one celebrity that was definitely forbidden was Edwards himself. He supposedly threatened to fire every member of his staff if they ever tried to turn the tables on him and publicly present Edwards' own life.

In a 1973 episode, Vincent Price was the surprised guest. The show had been planned with his wife Mary while Price was in the UK filming the movie Theatre of Blood. By the time he returned to his US home, he had split with his wife and he began a relationship with his co-star from the movie, Coral Browne. Price's daughter later revealed that his estranged wife had told him about the show in an attempt to manage any potential fallout and, unbeknownst to the producers, he agreed to act surprised when the show was recorded.

== Reception ==
This Is Your Life was nominated three times for as "Best Audience Participation, Quiz, or Panel Program" at the Emmy Awards, losing in 1953 at the 5th Emmy Awards to What's My Line? and sharing the category's award with What's My Line? at the Emmys in 1954 and 1955. It also fared well in the ratings during the 1950s, finishing at #11 in 1953–1954, #12 in 1954–1955, #26 in 1955–1956, #19 in 1957–1958 and #29 in 1958–1959.

By October 1960, Time magazine was calling This Is Your Life "the most sickeningly sentimental show on the air"; it cited a May 1960 episode on "Queens housewife and mother" Elizabeth Hahn as evidence that the show had "run through every faded actress still able to cry on cue" and had instead "turned to ordinary people as subjects for its weekly, treacly 'true-to-life' biographies." The episode on Hahn was also cited as an example of the limited research that the show was doing on its guests. The show had presented Hahn as "devoted to her husband and so dedicated to her children that she had worked as a chambermaid, waitress, and cook to further their education and keep them off the streets", ignoring details such as that Hahn, on the advice of her rabbi, had brought her daughter into a magistrate's court as a delinquent, and that before the episode was broadcast, Hahn's husband had sued her for divorce. Virginia Graham, in her autobiography, noted that the show had been characterized as a maudlin invasion of privacy.

== Reruns and revivals ==
In the late 1980s, Edwards taped new introductions for vintage This Is Your Life episodes featuring celebrities. American Movie Classics aired these updated versions for several years, accompanying them with "screenings of movies from studio-era Hollywood."

Edwards revived the series twice in syndication, the first in 1971 with Edwards again as host, and in 1983 with Joseph Campanella as host. Both failed to capture the magic of the original series, mostly due to the series being pre-recorded on film or tape and, in the case of the 1971–72 version, some stations that aired it gave away the surprise elements in ads and promos for the show. During the late 1980s, Edwards hosted a few single primetime network airings of This Is Your Life, most memorably an episode featuring Betty White and Dick Van Dyke.

Pat Sajak hosted an episode in November 1993 on NBC where Roy Scheider and Kathie Lee Gifford were the honorees, and Edwards made a cameo at the beginning, then appeared again when Kathie's work as a singer on the '70s version of Name that Tune, which Edwards produced, was mentioned. Actress Angie Dickinson was supposed to have been one of the two celebrities honored in the special, and was lured under the pretext of being interviewed for a special about director Brian de Palma, but when host Sajak surprised her with the typical "This is your life!" greeting to kick off the show she refused to participate and walked out. She later said that she had previously been approached about being a guest on the show and had declined, and that the main reason she refused to participate was that she didn't look good crying.

In November 2005, ABC announced that it was developing a new version of the show, to be hosted by Regis Philbin. Coincidentally, creator Ralph Edwards, died not long after the announcement was made. In August 2006, Philbin decided not to renew his contract with the show (he was committed to hosting America's Got Talent on NBC). ABC announced it was considering moving forward with another host in 2006, but this never came to fruition.

In October 2008, Survivor producer Mark Burnett signed a deal with Ralph Edwards Productions to produce an updated version. This also did not come to fruition.

== International versions ==
International adaptations of the show:

- Australia – This Is Your Life (1975–1980, 1995–2005, 2008, 2011, 2022–)
- Chile – Ésta es su vida (1965)
- Denmark – Her er dit liv (1983–1985, 1987, 1991, 1997–2000, 2011–2014)
- France – C'est votre vie ! ("This is your life!") (1993–1994, 2013–2015)
- Israel – חיים שכאלה ("What a life") (1972–2000, 2007, 2011–2012)
- Netherlands - In de hoofdrol (1960–1961, 1985–1987, 1992/1993)
- New Zealand – This Is Your Life (1984–2000, 2007–2008, 2010–2011)
- Norway – Dette er ditt liv (1985–1986, 1995)
- Peru – Ésta es su vida (1961)
- Sweden – Här är ditt liv ("Here is your life") (1980–1991, 1995, 2009–2010, 2019), Ett sånt liv (1995)
- Spain – Ésta es su vida (1962–1968, 1993)
- United Kingdom – This Is Your Life (1955–1964, 1969–2003, 2007)

In the Taiwanese variety show Super Sunday, the second half of each episode has a This Is Your Life-style segment where a celebrity or a local discussed their past followed by a cinematic re-enactment (usually exaggerated or serious) then a remote segment to search for the individual. However, the final result for each segment may or may not be successful.

== Parodies ==
- The show was parodied in 1954 by Your Show of Shows, as "This Is Your Story". Carl Reiner played the host, surprising an uncooperative audience member played by Sid Caesar.
- Another 1954 satire, the Warner Bros. movie short So You Want to Know Your Relatives, had guest of honor Joe McDoakes (played by George O'Hanlon) being confronted by guests from his unsavory past.
- In 1955, Warner Bros. animator Friz Freleng did a sendup called This Is a Life?, hosted by Elmer Fudd and featured Bugs Bunny as the guest of honor. The cartoon also featured Daffy Duck, Granny and Yosemite Sam.
- Bob and Ray issued a 45-rpm record with a routine called "This Is Your Bed (You Made It, Now Lie in It)" on Coral (catalog number 9-61338) in 1955.
- A 1960 episode of Walt Disney Presents, "This Is Your Life, Donald Duck", was a parody tribute to Donald Duck, hosted by Jiminy Cricket.
- There was a recurring segment on the children's program Sesame Street, "Here is Your Life", which followed the show's format but featured inanimate objects — a loaf of bread, an oak tree, a tooth, a house, a shoe, and a carton of eggs — as its guests. Like most of the game show parodies on Sesame Street, the show was hosted by the Muppet character Guy Smiley; seven sketches were produced between 1972 and 1990. During Season 26 (1994–1995), two others were hosted by Sonny Friendly and the sketch was retitled as "The New Here is Your Life", featuring a storybook and a glass of milk as honorees. Another variant, "This Is Your Story" (1982), was a one-shot featuring Guy honoring Muppet character Forgetful Jones.
- In 1976, the game show The Price Is Right parodied the show in one of its Showcase skits, called "This Is Your Strife," featuring bloopers involving model Janice Pennington. The cast had previously rehearsed a fake skit with Pennington, then sprung the "... Strife" skit on her as a surprise.
- As a part of a 1987 Howdy Doody 40th-anniversary retrospective special, Monty Hall and Buffalo Bob Smith imagined, as a way to celebrate Howdy Doody's birthday, a spoof of "This Is Your Life" called "Your Happiest Days".
- The WWE spoofed This Is Your Life three times with Mick Foley as the host. The purpose of these segments was to bring out individuals of the guest's past that embarrassed them. The most notable of these segments occurred on September 27, 1999, with The Rock. The first of these spoofs is still the highest TV rating for a non-wrestling match in Raw's history.
- In the early 1990s, McGruff the Crime Dog was honored by Ralph Edwards in a PSA from the Ad Council with National Crime Prevention Council.
- In Season 4 of The Good Place, a parody takes place in the show's afterlife setting, called "That Was Your Life".
