= This Is Your Life (New Zealand TV series) =

New Zealand television documentary show

- Genre: Reality; Documentary
- Presented by: Bob Parker (1984–1996); Paul Henry (2007–2008); Paul Holmes (1996–2000, 2010–2011)
- Country of origin: New Zealand
- Original language: English

Original release
- Network: TV One
- Release: 1984 – 2011

Related
- American version British version Australian version

This Is Your Life is a New Zealand television documentary show based on the American show of the same name, in which the host surprises guests with a show documenting their lives, with audience participation from their friends and family.

Thirty-nine New Zealanders have been honoured in the New Zealand version of the show, which has been broadcast on and off since 1984 on Television New Zealand's TVOne. It was originally hosted by Bob Parker (1984–1996), but more recent episodes have been presented by Paul Holmes (1996–2000) and Paul Henry (2007–2008). Most recently, racecar driver Scott Dixon was honoured, on 21 September 2008. Other recent recipients have included extreme sports pioneer, A. J. Hackett (who was profiled on 6 November 2007). Mark Inglis (who lost his legs on Mt Cook in 1982), the subject of an episode that was broadcast on 5 June 2007, and former All Blacks winger Jonah Lomu, who was honoured in a show that aired on 9 April 2007.

Prior to that, the last This Is Your Life programme in New Zealand was broadcast in September 2000. The subject of that episode was the runner Peter Snell.

Previous subjects of the show have included prominent figures in sports (such as George Nepia, John Walker, Sir Peter Blake, Mark Todd, Lance Cairns, Scott Dixon and Colin Meads), the arts (like Dame Kiri Te Kanawa, who also once appeared on the British edition of the show), Dame Malvina Major, Rob Guest, Rowena Jackson and Sir Howard Morrison), politics (e.g. Sonja Davies and Dame Catherine Tizard), broadcasting (like Sir Geoffrey Cox, Nola Luxford, Selwyn Toogood and Davina Whitehouse), literature (Barbara Ewing and A.K. Grant), science (Brian Harold Mason and William Pickering) and the military (Johnny Checketts and Charles Upham).

The show has also featured iconic New Zealanders such as mountaineer and explorer Sir Edmund Hillary, and Māori activist Dame Whina Cooper.

== 2010 revival ==
The show returned after two years' absence on 10 October 2010. Paul Henry was scheduled to appear as the host, but due to controversy surrounding occurrences on the TV show Breakfast, Henry was replaced with former host Paul Holmes. The book was presented to Sir Peter Leitch. Most recently, former All Black Zinzan Brooke was honoured on 17 October 2011.
