= Sea Legs (film) =

1930 film by Victor Heerman

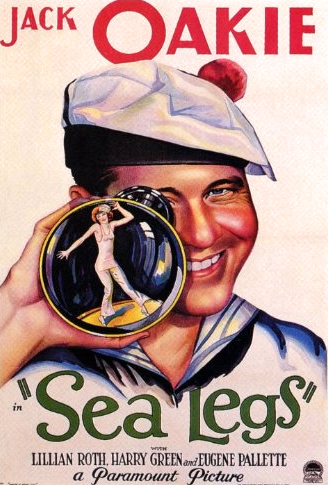
- Theatrical release poster
- Directed by: Victor Heerman
- Screenplay by: George Marion Jr.; Marion Dix
- Starring: Jack Oakie; Eugene Pallette; Lillian Roth; André Cheron; Albert Conti; Harry Green; Jean Del Val
- Cinematography: Allen G. Siegler
- Edited by: Doris Drought
- Music by: Ralph Rainger
- Production company: Paramount Pictures
- Distributed by: Paramount Pictures
- Release date: November 29, 1930
- Running time: 63 minutes
- Country: United States
- Language: English

Sea Legs is a 1930 American pre-Code comedy film directed by Victor Heerman and written by George Marion Jr. and Marion Dix. The film stars Jack Oakie, Eugene Pallette, Lillian Roth, André Cheron, Albert Conti, Harry Green and Jean Del Val. The film was released on November 29, 1930, by Paramount Pictures.

== Cast ==
- Jack Oakie as Searchlight Doyle
- Eugene Pallette as Hyacinth Nitouche
- Lillian Roth as Adrienne
- André Cheron as high commissioner
- Albert Conti as captain
- Harry Green as Gabriel Grabowski
- Jean Del Val as Crosseti
- Charles Sellon as Adm. O'Brien
- Tom Ricketts as commander
