= This Is Your Life (British TV series) =

British TV biographical series (1955–2003)

- Title card of 2007 revival
- Genre: Documentary; Biography
- Presented by: Ralph Edwards (1955, first episode); Eamonn Andrews (1955–1964, 1969–1987); David Nixon (1974, one episode); Michael Aspel (1988–2003); Trevor McDonald (2007)
- Country of origin: United Kingdom
- Original language: English
- No. of series: 43
- No. of episodes: 1,130 (285 missing)

Production
- Running time: 30–60 minutes
- Production companies: BBC (1955–1964); Thames Television (1969–2003); Click TV (2007); Ralph Edwards Productions (2007); STV Studios (2007); ITV Studios (2007); TIYL Productions (2007)

Original release
- Network: BBC Television
- Release: 29 July 1955 – 30 April 1964
- Network: ITV
- Release: 19 November 1969 – 20 July 1994
- Network: BBC One
- Release: 2 November 1994 – 8 August 2003
- Network: ITV
- Release: 2 June 2007

Related
- American version; New Zealand version; Australian version

This Is Your Life is a British biographical television series, based on the 1952 American series. In the show, the host surprises a special guest, before taking them through their life in a studio, with the assistance of the 'big red book'. Both celebrities and non-celebrities were featured on the show. The show was originally broadcast live, and over its run it alternated between being broadcast on the BBC and on ITV.

It was hosted by Eamonn Andrews from 1955 until 1964, and then from 1969 until his death in 1987. Michael Aspel then took up the role of host until the show ended in 2003. It briefly returned in 2007 as a one-off special presented by Trevor McDonald.

The surprise element was an important part of the show; if the guest heard about the project beforehand, it would be cancelled.

== History ==
The British version of the show was launched in 1955 on the BBC and was first presented by Ralph Edwards to the first subject, Eamonn Andrews, who was the presenter from the second show. The scriptwriter for the first 35 episodes was Gale Pedrick. In 1958, it was the most popular regular show on the BBC with audiences between 8.75 and 10.5 million. It ended in 1964 when Andrews moved to ABC Weekend TV, but it was revived by Thames Television for broadcast on ITV in 1969.

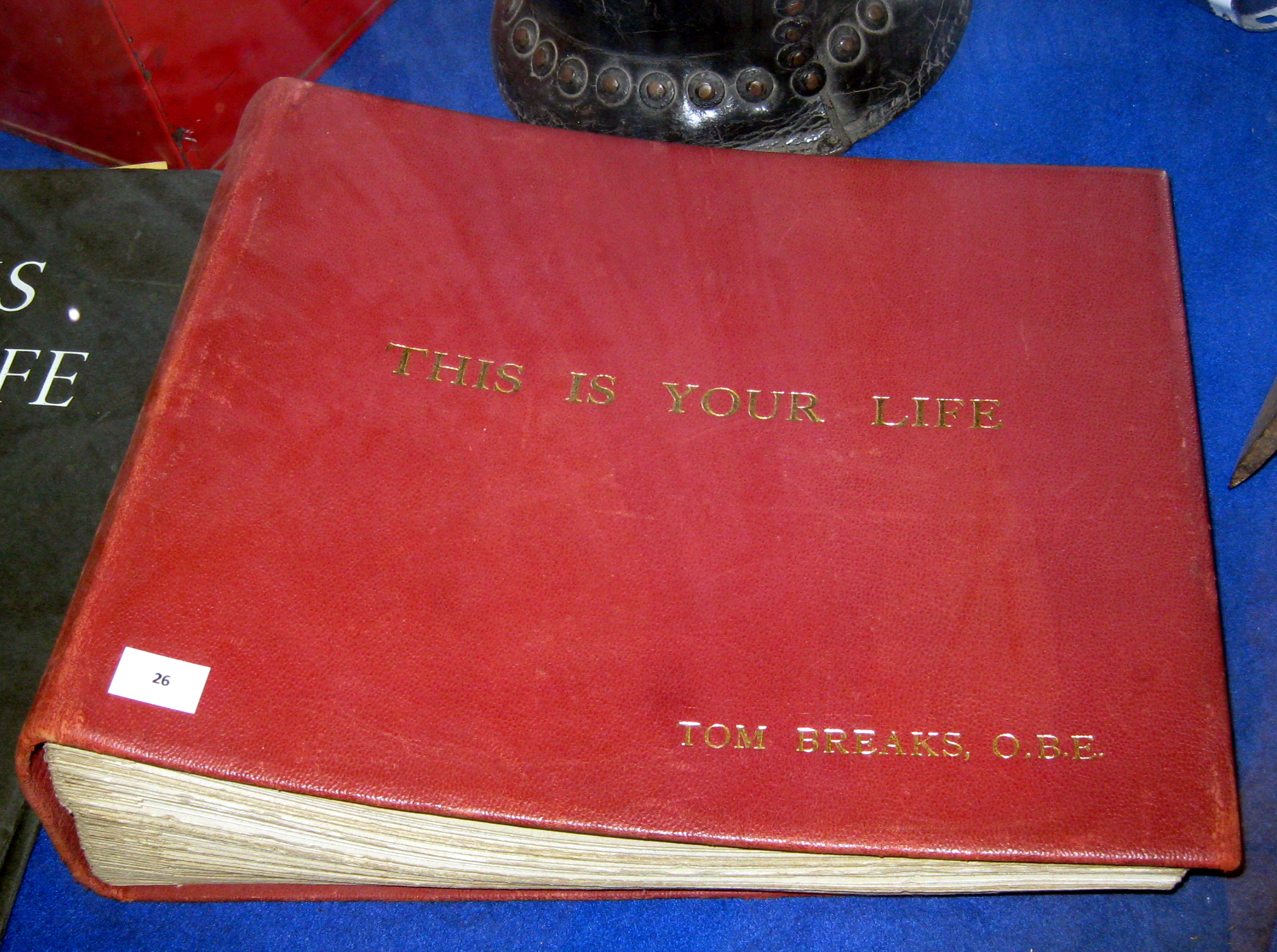
The big red book for fireman Tom Breaks, Mon 26 Mar 1962

The only other occasion during Andrews' presentational run where he was not the presenter was in 1974 when he was the subject a second time, and the show was presented by David Nixon. Michael Aspel (himself, a subject in 1980) became presenter after Andrews died in 1987. The show returned to the BBC in 1994 but was still produced independently by Thames Television, by then no longer an ITV contractor. The programme was discontinued again in 2003.

The show returned in June 2007 on ITV for a one-off-special programme hosted by Sir Trevor McDonald with guest Simon Cowell. The new edition was co-produced by ITV Productions, STV Productions, TIYL Productions, Click TV and Ralph Edwards Productions.

== Notable guests ==
Hattie Jacques appeared in 1963, with her husband John Le Mesurier who had helped set up the surprise; however, she was at the time living with her lover John Schofield while Le Mesurier lived in a separate room in the same house.

Ronnie Barker was planned to be one of the show's subjects and his wife Joy Tubb was helping the producers with the set up and pre-production, but Barker revealed in his autobiography that he had become upset by his wife's obvious secrecy and even began to suspect she might have been having an extra-marital affair. Barker confronted his wife and she had to explain to him about the programme, leading to its cancellation. Barker took the opportunity to impress upon his wife that he never wanted to be featured on the show, so future attempts to plan an edition around him were thwarted.

Maureen Lipman revealed in her first autobiographical book that she had made an arrangement with her agent and her husband that she would never participate in the programme should they ever be approached, with her husband Jack Rosenthal also agreeing he would never be the subject. Both were willing and happy to appear as a guest on other editions featuring their friends. Lipman light-heartedly revealed that her refusal to be featured was the thing that upset her mother the most about her career.

Christopher Lee was the subject of the show in April 1974. He was surprised by Eamonn Andrews during a fencing match that was being filmed for the children's TV series Magpie.

Peter Davison was the featured celebrity in March 1982. He later revealed in interviews and his autobiography that the planned finale of his edition was to be the appearance of actress Beryl Reid, but Davison's then-wife Sandra Dickinson objected and persuaded the producers not to end the show in this way as Davison and Reid barely knew each other, having worked together only once for two days' recording. Reid's inclusion was to maximise publicity for the two episodes of Doctor Who that the BBC were airing at the same time as Davison's This Is Your Life. Dickinson won her argument, and although Reid appeared, the edition ended instead with the reunion of Davison and his Guyanese aunt.

In May 1971, Googie Withers was the featured guest, but the surprise planned by host Eamonn Andrews did not go according to plan, when Withers arrived in the studio, thinking she was going to be interviewed by Godfrey Winn. When Andrews stepped forward with the red book, Withers asked him why he was working as a floor manager and no longer as a presenter. This was in part due to her living in Australia where the show was not known.

In 1996, the Sunday Mirror reported that a planned show for Cockney comedy actor Arthur Mullard was pulled after researchers contacted his eldest son. The same report featured claims that Mullard had terrorised his family and had sexually abused his daughter for many years.

David Butler was 17 when he became the youngest-ever subject of This Is Your Life (episode aired 5 March 1962). He was surprised by Eamonn Andrews in the headmaster's study of Hemel Hempstead Grammar School. Butler lost both his legs and a hand when, aged 11, he found an unexploded bomb on Ivinghoe Beacon.

Tottenham Hotspur and Northern Ireland football legend Danny Blanchflower became the first person to refuse to appear on the television show on February 6, 1961. Host Eamonn Andrews attempted to surprise Blanchflower with the famous big red book under the guise of recording a sports segment. When Andrews announced the famous line, "Tonight, Danny Blanchflower, This Is Your Life," the Spurs captain famously replied, "Oh no it's not," and walked away. Because he declined on the spot and it was a live programme, the BBC had to quickly substitute a different pre-planned emergency episode featuring Somerset doctor Robert Fawcus. Blanchflower later stated he never regretted his split-second decision to walk away from the cameras.

== Theme music ==
The theme tune used from 1969 onwards was called "Gala Performance", and was composed by Laurie Johnson for KPM.

== Transmissions ==
=== BBC ===
Series	Start date	End date	Episodes	Presenter
1	29 July 1955	6 May 1956	15	Eamonn Andrews
2	1 October 1956	27 May 1957	19	Eamonn Andrews
3	30 September 1957	5 May 1958	31	Eamonn Andrews
4	29 September 1958	11 May 1959	33	Eamonn Andrews
5	31 August 1959	28 March 1960	31	Eamonn Andrews
6	19 September 1960	8 May 1961	34	Eamonn Andrews
7	2 October 1961	7 May 1962	32	Eamonn Andrews
8	2 October 1962	14 May 1963	31	Eamonn Andrews
9	3 October 1963	30 April 1964	30	Eamonn Andrews

=== ITV ===
Series	Start date	End date	Episodes	Presenter
10	19 November 1969	27 May 1970	26	Eamonn Andrews
11	18 November 1970	12 May 1971	26	Eamonn Andrews
12	17 November 1971	10 May 1972	26	Eamonn Andrews
13	15 November 1972	9 May 1973	26	Eamonn Andrews
14	21 November 1973	15 May 1974	27	Eamonn Andrews
15	10 October 1974	7 May 1975	27	Eamonn Andrews
16	12 November 1975	5 May 1976	26	Eamonn Andrews
17	27 October 1976	27 April 1977	27	Eamonn Andrews
18	23 November 1977	31 May 1978	27	Eamonn Andrews
19	25 October 1978	3 May 1979	27	Eamonn Andrews
20	28 November 1979	21 May 1980	26	Eamonn Andrews
21	15 October 1980	15 April 1981	26	Eamonn Andrews
22	13 October 1981	31 March 1982	26	Eamonn Andrews
23	20 October 1982	13 April 1983	26	Eamonn Andrews
24	26 October 1983	18 April 1984	26	Eamonn Andrews
25	7 November 1984	8 May 1985	27	Eamonn Andrews
26	16 October 1985	30 April 1986	26	Eamonn Andrews
27	15 October 1986	8 April 1987	26	Eamonn Andrews
28	14 October 1987	20 January 1988	7	Eamonn Andrews
29	19 October 1988	1 March 1989	20	Michael Aspel
30	25 October 1989	7 May 1990	27	Michael Aspel
31	17 October 1990	17 April 1991	26	Michael Aspel
32	16 October 1991	15 April 1992	26	Michael Aspel
33	30 September 1992	21 April 1993	30	Michael Aspel
34	12 January 1994	20 July 1994	26	Michael Aspel

=== BBC1 ===
Series	Start date	End date	Episodes	Presenter
35	2 November 1994	17 May 1995	28	Michael Aspel
36	6 September 1995	6 March 1996	27	Michael Aspel
37	20 September 1996	24 March 1997	26	Michael Aspel
38	1 September 1997	23 February 1998	26	Michael Aspel
39	7 September 1998	1 March 1999	26	Michael Aspel
40	1 November 1999	29 May 2000	28	Michael Aspel
41	9 November 2000	7 June 2001	26	Michael Aspel
42	17 October 2001	23 May 2002	26	Michael Aspel
43	2 January 2003	8 August 2003	25	Michael Aspel

=== Special ===
Special No.	Air date	Guest	Presenter
1	2 June 2007	Simon Cowell	Sir Trevor McDonald
