= Say Goodbye, Maggie Cole =

1972 film by Jud Taylor

- Genre: Drama; Romance
- Written by: Sandor Stern
- Directed by: Jud Taylor
- Starring: Susan Hayward; Darren McGavin; Michael Constantine; Michele Nichols; Dane Clark; Beverly Garland; Jeanette Nolan
- Music by: Hugo Montenegro
- Country of origin: United States
- Original language: English

Production
- Producers: Leonard Goldberg; Robert Monroe; Aaron Spelling
- Cinematography: Bill Mosher
- Editor: Tim Southcott
- Running time: 73 minutes
- Production companies: ABC Circle Films; Spelling-Goldberg Productions

Original release
- Network: ABC
- Release: September 27, 1972

Say Goodbye, Maggie Cole is a 1972 American made-for-television drama film directed by Jud Taylor and starring Susan Hayward, Darren McGavin, Michael Constantine, Michele Nichols, Dane Clark, Beverly Garland and Jeanette Nolan.

== Plot ==
A widowed doctor (Susan Hayward) joins a colleague's (Darren McGavin) Chicago slum clinic and befriends a dying girl.

== Cast ==
- Susan Hayward as Dr Maggie Cole
- Darren McGavin as Dr Lou Grazzo
- Michael Constantine as Dr Sweeney
- Michele Nichols as Lisa Downey
- Dane Clark as Hank Cooper
- Beverly Garland as Myrna Anderson
- Jeanette Nolan as Mrs Downey
- Maidie Norman as Fergy—Nurse Ferguson
- Richard Anderson as Dr Ben Cole
- Frank Puglia as Mr. Alissandro
- Harry Basch as Isadore Glass
- Leigh Adams as Night Nurse #1
- Jan Peters as Ivan Dvorsky
- Robert Cleaves as Brig
- Richard Carlyle as Mr. Anderson
- Mina Martinez as Night Nurse #2
- Peter Hobbs as Pathologist
- Guy Remsen as Policeman
- Jerrie Woolen as Day Nurse #2
- Bob Bennett as Waiter
- Virginia Hawkins as Day Nurse #1
- Scott Edmonds as Barney

== Production ==
It was meant to be the first of three pictures Hayward was to make for Aaron Spelling. Dusty Springfield recorded an original song for the film, believed to be only the second time this had been done for a TV movie.

== See also ==
- List of American films of 1972
