= A Letter from Bataan =

Paramount Victory Short No. T2-1: A Letter from Bataan
- Directed by: William H. Pine
- Written by: Maxwell Shane
- Produced by: William C. Thomas
- Starring: Richard Arlen; Susan Hayward; Jimmy Lydon; Joe Sawyer
- Cinematography: Fred Jackman Jr.
- Edited by: Howard A. Smith
- Music by: Daniele Amfitheatrof
- Release date: September 15, 1942
- Running time: 15 minutes
- Country: United States
- Language: English

A Letter from Bataan is a 1942 "Victory Short" propaganda film made by Paramount Pictures in collaboration with the U.S. Office of War Information and the United States Government. It was directed by William H. Pine, produced by William C. Thomas and written by Maxwell Shane. It had music by Daniele Amfitheatrof and the cinematography was by Fred Jackman Jr.

The film features Richard Arlen, Susan Hayward, Jimmy Lydon and Betty Hutton appearing as herself.

The film is part of a series of films made by Paramount intended to encourage more active participation in the U.S. war effort.
