= I'll Cry Tomorrow =

1955 film by Daniel Mann

- Directed by: Daniel Mann
- Written by: Helen Deutsch; Jay Richard Kennedy
- Based on: I'll Cry Tomorrow; 1954 book by Lillian Roth; Mike Connolly; Gerold Frank
- Produced by: Lawrence Weingarten
- Starring: Susan Hayward; Richard Conte; Eddie Albert; Margo; Jo Van Fleet
- Cinematography: Arthur E. Arling
- Edited by: Harold F. Kress
- Music by: Alex North
- Distributed by: Metro-Goldwyn-Mayer
- Release date: December 25, 1955
- Running time: 119 minutes
- Country: United States
- Language: English
- Budget: $2,147,000
- Box office: $7,727,000

I'll Cry Tomorrow is a 1955 American biographical film directed by Daniel Mann that tells the story of Lillian Roth, a Broadway star who rebels against the pressure of her domineering mother and struggles with alcoholism after the death of her fiancé. It stars Susan Hayward, Richard Conte, Eddie Albert, Margo and Jo Van Fleet. The screenplay was adapted by Helen Deutsch and Jay Richard Kennedy from the 1954 autobiography by Lillian Roth, cowritten by Mike Connolly and Gerold Frank.

The film won the Academy Award for Best Costume Design for Helen Rose and earned three other Academy Award nominations, including Best Actress for Susan Hayward. It was entered into the 1956 Cannes Film Festival, where Hayward won the prize for Best Actress.

== Plot ==
Eight-year-old Lillian Roth is constantly pushed by her domineering stage mother Katie to audition and act. When Lillian is a young adult, Katie secures an opportunity that launches her musical career. Even though 20 years have passed, Katie still is managing Lillian, as well as running her life and career choices.

Lillian learns that her childhood friend David is in the hospital, and they soon fall in love. Because David is an entertainment company lawyer, he is able to secure Lillian shows at some large venues, including the Palace Theatre. However, David feels that Katie is projecting her own ambitions onto Lillian and overworking her, and Katie believes that a new man in Lillian's life only serves to distract from her high-profile career. When Lillian informs her mother she intends to marry David, Katie is disappointed and sees a repeat of her own life happening. David suddenly falls ill and dies during the opening night of Lillian's show, and she is despondent at having lost the love of her life.

Rebelling against her mother's domineering ways, Lillian turns to drinking. One night, in a drunken stupor, she marries aviator Wallie but does not remember it when sober. They remain married, but the marriage is loveless from the beginning and they both drink to excess. Lillian's career suffers as a result of her persistent alcoholism, and she spends all of her money without booking new shows. The couple divorces after Wallie says he is "sick of being Mr. Lillian Roth".

Two years later, Lillian falls for fellow alcoholic Tony Bardeman. However, Lillian endures alcohol withdrawal when she stops drinking to please her mother, and she instead becomes a secret drinker. Lillian begs Tony to stay with her and they agree to stop drinking together, but once they are married, Tony starts to drink and Lillian is outraged. When she tries to stop him from drinking and leave him, he beats her. She escapes Tony's clutches and travels to New York to live with her mother but contemplates suicide after they fight. Lillian takes refuge in an Alcoholics Anonymous shelter but suffers bouts of delirium tremens as she experiences withdrawal. She begins to fall for her sponsor Burt McGuire, but the crippling effects of childhood polio make him wary of a relationship. As Lillian continues her recovery, she is invited to appear on the This Is Your Life television program to share her story of alcoholism and recovery.

== Cast ==
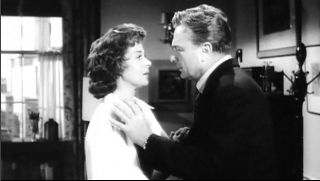
Susan Hayward and Eddie Albert

- Susan Hayward as Lillian Roth
- Richard Conte as Tony Bardeman
- Eddie Albert as Burt McGuire
- Jo Van Fleet as Katie Silverman Roth, Lillian's mother
- Don Taylor as Wallie
- Ray Danton as David Tredman
- Margo as Selma
- Virginia Gregg as Ellen
- Don 'Red' Barry as Jerry
- David Kasday as David as a child
- Carole Ann Campbell as Lillian (a child)
- Peter Leeds as Richard Elstead
- Tol Avery as Drunk party guest, Joe
- Anthony Jochim as Paul (butler)
- Jack Daley as Cab driver
- Ralph Edwards as himself, as host of This Is Your Life (uncredited)
- Florence Ravenel as Stage mother (uncredited)

== Reception ==
In a contemporary review for The New York Times, critic Bosley Crowther called I'll Cry Tomorrow an "uncommon personalized drama" and wrote:

The one weakness of this picture—as a psychological study, at least—is its failure to make it seem compulsory that the heroine should take to belting booze. Sure, her mother is a sore vexation to her ... But this hardly seems adequate reason for the daughter to take to drink—certainly not the rock-ribbed daughter that Miss Hayward makes her appear. Also, it might well be unsettling to lose a handsome fiancé from some sudden lethal affliction and have a couple of subsequent marriages go bad ... But for such unhappy experiences to turn a lady into a lush, there must be some basic insecurity. And it is this that the picture does not show. ... She gives little sign of being neurotic, unstable or perverse. Thus, when she does take to boozing, it seems arbitrary and contrived ... And when her excesses finally take her down, down the hill to Skid Row and to the brink of suicide out a window, she is almost too tragic to behold. This unstinted build-up of pathos may well counteract the question, "Why?"

According to MGM records, the film returned receipts of $5,873,000 in the U.S. and Canada and $1,854,000 in other markets, resulting in a profit of $2,933,000.

== Awards and nominations ==
| Award | Category | Nominee(s) | Result | Ref. |
|---|---|---|---|---|
| Academy Awards | Best Actress | Susan Hayward | Nominated | |
| Academy Awards | Best Art Direction – Black-and-White | Art Direction: Cedric Gibbons and Malcolm Brown; Set Decoration: Edwin B. Willis and Hugh Hunt | Nominated | |
| Academy Awards | Best Cinematography – Black-and-White | Arthur Arling | Nominated | |
| Academy Awards | Best Costume Design – Black-and-White | Helen Rose | Won | |
| British Academy Film Awards | Best Foreign Actress | Susan Hayward | Nominated | |
| Cannes Film Festival | Palme d'Or | Daniel Mann | Nominated | |
| Cannes Film Festival | Best Actress | Susan Hayward | Won | |
| Golden Globe Awards | Most Promising Newcomer – Male | Ray Danton | Won | |
| Laurel Awards | Top Female Dramatic Performance | Susan Hayward | Won | |
| Laurel Awards | Top Female Character Performance | Jo Van Fleet | Won | |

== See also ==
- List of American films of 1955
