= I'll Cry Tomorrow (book) =

1954 autobiography by Lillian Roth

- First edition cover
- Author: Lillian Roth, Gerold Frank, Mike Connolly
- Language: English
- Genre: Autobiography
- Publisher: Frederick Fell Publishers, Inc.
- Publication date: 1954

I'll Cry Tomorrow is a 1954 autobiography by Lillian Roth, co-written by Roth, Gerold Frank and journalist Mike Connolly. It is a "brutally frank" depiction of Roth's alcoholism, one of the earlier books by a celebrity on addiction, and influential in drawing attention to alcoholism as a disease. It sold over 7 million copies in 20 languages. It was adapted into the 1955 film of the same name.
