= Lillian Roth =

American actress, singer (1910-1980)

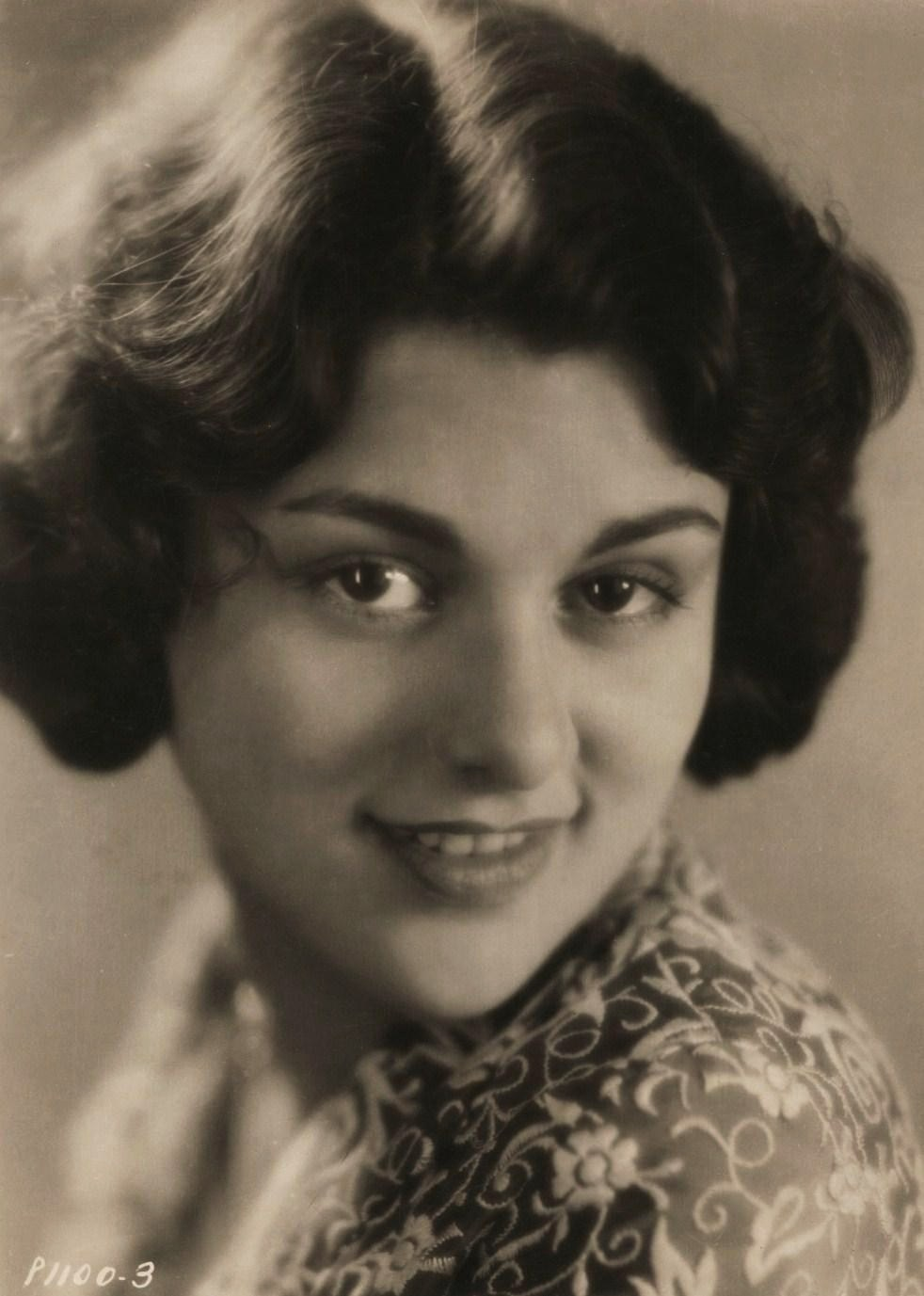
- Roth in 1929.
- Born: Lillian Rutstein; December 13, 1910; Boston, Massachusetts, U.S.
- Died: May 12, 1980 (aged 69); New York City, U.S.
- Occupation: Actress
- Years active: 1917–1980
- Spouse(s): William C. Scott (1931–1932; divorced); Benjamin Shalleck (1933–1939; divorced); Eugene Weiner (1940–1941; divorced); Edward Goldman (1942–1945; divorced); Thomas Burt McGuire (1947–1963; divorced)

Lillian Roth (December 13, 1910 – May 12, 1980) was an American singer and actress.

Her life story was told in the 1955 film I'll Cry Tomorrow, in which she was portrayed by Susan Hayward, who was nominated for the Academy Award for Best Actress for her performance.

== Early life ==
Roth was born on December 13, 1910, in Boston, Massachusetts, to Katie (née Silverman) and Arthur Rutstein, who were both Jewish. At the age of six, Roth was taken by her mother to Educational Pictures, where she became the company's trademark, symbolized by a living statue holding a lamp of knowledge. In her 1954 autobiography I'll Cry Tomorrow, Roth alleged that she had been molested by the man who had painted her as a statue. She attended the Professional Children's School in New York City with classmates Ruby Keeler and Milton Berle.

In 1917, Roth made her Broadway debut as the character Flossie in The Inner Man. Her film debut occurred the following year, when she performed as an extra in the government documentary Pershing's Crusaders. She and her sister Ann also toured together during this period as Lillian Roth and Co., although at times they were billed as the Roth Kids. According to Roth's autobiography, one of the highlights of the tour was meeting U.S. president Woodrow Wilson, who attended the girls' vaudeville act and later allowed them to ride with him briefly in his chauffeur-driven car.

Roth entered the Clark School of Concentration in the early 1920s. She appeared in Artists and Models in 1923 and Revels with Frank Fay. The 13-year-old Roth lied to the show's producers, telling them that she was 19 years old.

== Career ==
In 1927, at the age of 17, Roth returned to Broadway to perform in the first of three Earl Carroll Vanities, which was followed by Midnight Frolics, a Florenz Ziegfeld production.

Roth performing in Down Among the Sugar Cane (1932), a seven-minute Paramount short with a follow-along "bouncing ball" singing sequence and animated cartoon work produced by Fleischer Studios.

Roth signed a seven-year contract with Paramount Pictures, where she appeared in The Love Parade (1929) with Maurice Chevalier and Jeanette MacDonald, The Vagabond King (1930), Paramount on Parade (1930), Honey (1930) (in which she introduced "Sing You Sinners"), Cecil B. DeMille's Madam Satan (1930) with Reginald Denny and Kay Johnson, Sea Legs with Jack Oakie and the Marx Brothers' second film, Animal Crackers (1930). She took Ethel Merman's stage role in the film version of Take a Chance, singing "Eadie Was a Lady". After leaving Paramount, Roth was cast by Warner Bros. in a supporting role in the 1933 women's prison film Ladies They Talk About starring Barbara Stanwyck.

Roth headlined the Palace Theatre in New York and performed in the Earl Carroll Vanities in 1928, 1931 and 1932.

Ain't She Sweet (1933) with a short film of Roth singing during the latter half of the cartoon.

During this time, Roth's personal life increasingly was overshadowed by her alcoholism. Although her parents were not stereotypical stage parents, as a response to their influence, Roth came to rely too much on other people. In her books and interviews, she said she was too trusting of husbands who made key decisions concerning her money and contracts.

Roth was out of the limelight by the late 1930s. Her personal and spiritual feelings led her to convert to Catholicism in 1948. Friends accused her of forsaking Judaism; however, in her autobiography, Roth explained that although her parents had believed in God, she and her sister had not been brought up with a religious foundation.

In February 1953, Roth appeared on an episode of the television series This Is Your Life, hosted by Ralph Edwards, and related her story of alcoholism. As a result, she received more than 40,000 letters.

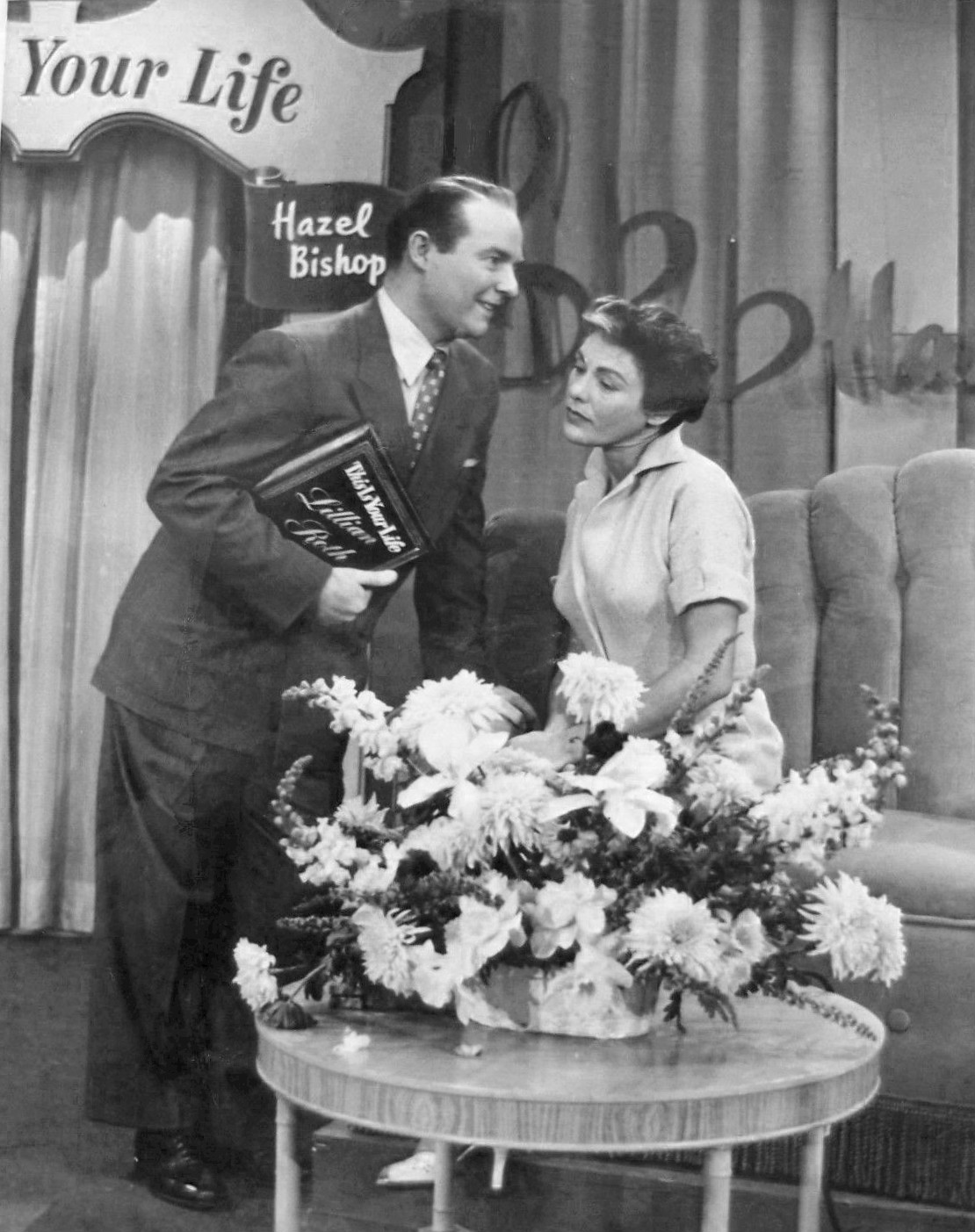
Roth's appearance on This Is Your Life

In 1962, Roth was featured as Elliott Gould's mother in the Broadway musical I Can Get It for You Wholesale, in which Barbra Streisand made her Broadway debut. Despite the acclaim for Streisand, producer David Merrick realized that Roth's name still sold tickets, and he elevated her to top star billing after the show's opening, with Gould, Streisand and Sheree North listed below. Roth remained with the show for its full run of 301 performances and recorded the cast album for Columbia Records.

In 1965, Roth was featured as Rose Brice (mother of Fanny Brice) in the national touring company of Funny Girl (with Marilyn Michaels as Fanny), again receiving top billing. Her final Broadway appearance was in the short-lived musical 70, Girls, 70.

Her theme song, which she began singing as a child performer, was "When the Red, Red Robin (Comes Bob, Bob, Bobbin' Along)".

== Autobiographies ==
Roth wrote her autobiography I'll Cry Tomorrow with author-collaborator Gerold Frank in 1954, and a softened version of the story became the basis of a hit film of the same title the following year, starring Susan Hayward, who was nominated for an Academy Award. The book became a bestseller worldwide and sold more than seven million copies in 20 languages, and the film renewed the public's interest in Roth. She recorded four songs for the Coral label (the first commercial recordings of her career), which were followed by an LP for Epic and another for Tops. She also headlined a vaudeville revival at the Palace Theatre on Broadway. A highlight of her act was an imitation of Hayward's imitation of Roth singing "Red, Red Robin".

In 1958, Roth published a second book, Beyond My Worth, which was not as successful as its predecessor. Roth tried to reinvent herself as a major concert and nightclub performer. She appeared at venues in Las Vegas and New York's Copacabana and was a popular attraction in Australia.

== Personal life ==
Roth was married five times: to aviator William C. Scott, Judge Benjamin Shalleck, security salesman Eugene J. Weiner, Edward Goldman (Vic) and Thomas Burt McGuire. Before her marriages, she was engaged to David Lyons, who died of tuberculosis.

She divorced her first husband, William C. Scott, in 1932 after 13 months of marriage.

She married her second husband, Judge Benjamin Shalleck, in 1933. They met when he heard a case she had brought disputing a garage bill, in which he ruled against her. Claiming that he objected to her career, she obtained a divorce in California in 1939.

In 1947, she met McGuire, scion of Funk & Wagnalls Publishing Company at an Alcoholics Anonymous meeting. McGuire managed Roth until September 1963, when he sent her a note stating that their marriage was finished.

== Later life ==
In 1970, Roth lived in Palm Springs, California. She returned to Broadway in 1971 in the Kander and Ebb musical 70, Girls, 70 and played a pathologist in the 1976 cult horror film Alice, Sweet Alice. Her last film was Boardwalk (1979) with Lee Strasberg, Ruth Gordon and Janet Leigh. Roth's successful concert at The Town Hall was released as an album by AEI Records after her death. One of her final appearances came in a club act at the New York nightclub Reno Sweeney.

== Death ==
After suffering a stroke at her New York apartment in February 1980, Roth died at age 69 on May 12 at De Witt Nursing Home in Manhattan.

== Filmography ==
=== Features ===
Year	Title	Role	Notes
1929	Illusion	Revolutionary Rhythm Dance Specialty	
1929	The Love Parade	Lulu	
1930	The Vagabond King	Huguette	
1930	Honey	Cora Falkner	
1930	Paramount on Parade	Herself	Episode: "Love Time"
1930	Madame Satan	Trixie	
1930	Animal Crackers	Arabella Rittenhouse	
1930	Sea Legs	Adrienne	
1933	Ladies They Talk About	Linda, The Prisoner	
1933	Take a Chance	Wanda Hill	
1976	Alice, Sweet Alice	Pathologist	
1979	Night-Flowers	Deaf neighbor	
1979	Boardwalk	Ruth	

=== Short subjects ===
Year	Title	Role	Notes
1918	Pershing's Crusaders		Uncredited extra
1929	Lillian Roth and Band	Herself	
1929	Lillian Roth and Her Piano Boys	Herself	
1929	Lillian Roth and the Foster Girls	Herself	
1929	Raising the Roof		
1930	Meet the Boyfriend		
1932	Down Among the Sugar Cane		
1932	Naughty-Cal	Herself	
1933	Ain't She Sweet		
1933	Million Dollar Melody	Herself	
1934	Story Conference	Herself	
1934	Masks and Memories	Julie / Emmy Lou	
1939	Arcade Varieties	Singer	
1939	Snow Follies	Herself	
