= Louis Jordan discography =

- Studio albums: 10
- Live albums: 1
- Compilation albums: 10+
- Singles: 125

Louis Jordan was an American popular music innovator who recorded from the 1930s until the 1970s. During the 1940s, he was the most popular recording artist of the soon-to-be-called rhythm and blues music. (Note: Whitburn 1988, p. 584.) Jordan had eighteen No. 1 hits, which places him as the third most successful singles artist in Billboard R&B charts history. (Note: Aretha Franklin and Stevie Wonder are tied for first with twenty each.) His 1946 recording of "Choo Choo Ch'Boogie" is tied for second place for spending the most weeks (eighteen) at No. 1. (Note: Joe Liggins's "The Honeydripper" was also No. 1 for eighteen weeks.) Jordan's success was not limited to the R&B market — he also had No. 1 hits on the Billboard Pop and Country charts.

The peak of Jordan's popularity occurred when the two-song record single was the typical format, before the emergence of the long-playing record album. As a result, although he recorded prolifically, he had relatively few albums until compilations began appearing after his death in 1975. Listed here are the singles and albums Jordan recorded during his career, as well as the more current and notable compilations.

== Singles ==
=== 1930s ===
Year	Title	Details	Peak chart positions
Year	Title	Details	(Note: 1930s chart information is not available.)
1939	"Honey in the Bee Ball"	Composer: Louis Jordan; Recorded: December 30, 1938; Label: Decca 7556	
1939	"Barnacle Bill the Sailor"	Composer: Frank Luther, Carson Robison; Recorded: December 30, 1938; Label: Decca 7556	
1939	"Flat Face"	Composer: Courtney Williams; Recorded: March 29, 1939; Label: Decca 7590	
1939	"Doug the Jitterbug"	Composer: Jordan; Recorded: March 29, 1939; Label: Decca 7590	
1939	"Keep a-Knockin’"	Composer: Jordan, Perry Bradford, J. Mayo Williams; Recorded: March 29, 1939; Label: Decca 7609	
1939	"At the Swing Cat’s Ball"	Composer: Campbell; Recorded: March 29, 1939; Label: Decca 7609	
1939	"Sam Jones Done Snagged His Britches"	Composer: Perry Bradford, J. Mayo Williams; Recorded: March 29, 1939; Label: Decca 7623	
1939	"Swinging in a Cocoanut Tree"	Composer: J. Mayo Williams; Recorded: March 29, 1939; Label: Decca 7623	
1939	"Honeysuckle Rose" (Note: Reissued in 1950 on 25473.)	Composer: Fats Waller, Andy Razaf; Recorded: November 14, 1939; Label: Decca 7675	
1939	"But I’ll Be Back"	Composer: Jordan; Recorded: November 14, 1939; Label: Decca 7675	
1939	"‘Fore Day Blues"	Composer: Perry Bradford, J. Mayo Williams; Recorded: November 14, 1939; Label: Decca 7693	
1939	"You Ain’t Nowhere"	Composer: Jordan, Don Redman; Recorded: November 14, 1939; Label: Decca 7693	
1939	"You’re My Meat"	Composer: Skeets Tolbert; Recorded: November 14, 1939; Label: Decca 7719	
1939	"Jake, What a Snake"	Composer: J. Mayo Williams; Recorded: November 14, 1939; Label: Decca 7719	
Blank in chart positions indicates release that did not chart.

=== 1940s ===
Year	Title	Details	Peak chart positions (Note: Whitburn 1988, pp. 229–230.)		
Year	Title	Details	R&B	Pop	C&W
1940	"Hard Lovin’ Blues" (Note: Vocals by Yack Taylor.)	Composer: Yack Taylor; Recorded: January 25, 1940; Label: Decca 7705			
1940	"You Run Your Mouth and I’ll Run My Business" (Note: Reissued in 1949 on 24643.)	Composer: Lil Armstrong; Recorded: January 25, 1940; Label: Decca 7705			
1940	"I'm Alabama Bound"	Composer: Mike Jackson, Robert Hoffman; Recorded: January 25, 1940; Label: Decca 7723			
1940	"June Teenth Jamboree"	Composer: Sammy Price; Recorded: January 25, 1940; Label: Decca 7723			
1940	"You Got to Go When the Wagon Comes" (Note: Vocal by Daisy Winchester.)	Composer: Randy Culbreth, Jasper Thomas; Recorded: March 13, 1940; Label: Decca 7729			
1940	"After School Swing Session (Swinging with Symphony Sid)"	Composer: Jordan, Buddy Feyne; Recorded: March 13, 1940; Label: Decca 7729			
1940	"Lovie Joe" (Note: Vocal by Mabel Robinson.)	Composer: Jordan, Will Marion Cook; Recorded: March 13, 1940; Label: Decca 7745			
1940	"Somebody Done Hoodooed the Hoodoo Man"	Composer: Wesley Wilson; Recorded: March 13, 1940; Label: Decca 7745			
1940	"Bounce the Ball (Do Da Little Um Day)"	Composer: Mike Jackson; Recorded: March 13, 1940; Label: Decca 3253			
1940	"Don’t Come Crying on My Shoulder"	Composer: Arthur Altman, Manny Kurtz, Murray Mencher; Recorded: April 29, 1940; Label: Decca 3253			
1940	"Never Let Your Left Hand Know What Your Right Hand’s Doin’"	Composer: Ted Delaney, Georgia South; Recorded: April 29, 1940; Label: Decca 7777			
1940	"Penthouse in the Basement"	Composer: Walter Bishop, Sr.; Recorded: March 13, 1940; Label: Decca 7777			
1940	"Oh Boy, I’m in the Groove	Composer: Ella Fitzgerald; Recorded: April 29, 1940; Label: Decca 3360			
1940	"Waitin’ for the Robert E. Lee"	Composer: L. Wolfe Gilbert, Lewis F. Muir; Recorded: April 29, 1940; Label: Decca 3360			
1940	"Do You Call that a Buddy? (Dirty Cat)"	Composer: Wesley Wilson; Recorded: September 30, 1940; Label: Decca 8500			
1940	"Pompton Turnpike"	Composer: Will Osborne, Dick Rogers; Recorded: September 30, 1940; Label: Decca 8500			
1940	"I Know You (I Know What You Wanna Do)"	Composer: Jordan; Recorded: September 30, 1940; Label: Decca 8501			
1940	"A Chicken Ain't Nothin' but a Bird"	Composer: Emmett "Babe" Wallace; Recorded: September 30, 1940; Label: Decca 8501			
1941	"T-Bone Blues"	Composer: T-Bone Walker, Les Hite; Recorded: January 24, 1941; Label: Decca 8525			
1941	"Pinetop's Boogie Woogie" (Note: Reissued in 1950 on 25394.)	Composer: Pinetop Smith; Recorded: January 24, 1941; Label: Decca 8525			
1941	"The Two Little Squirrels (Nuts to You)"	Composer: Mack David, Eddie Lane, Vee Lawnhurst; Recorded: January 24, 1941; Label: Decca 8537			
1941	"Pan-Pan"	Composer: Jerry Daniels; Recorded: January 24, 1941; Label: Decca 8537			
1941	"Saxa-Woogie"	Composer: Jordan; Recorded: April 2, 1941; Label: Decca 8560			
1941	"Brotherly Love (Wrong Ideas)"	Composer: Jordan, Leonard Feather, J. Mayo Williams; Recorded: April 2, 1941; Label: Decca 8560			
1941	"Boogie Woogie Came to Town"	Composer: Jordan, Walter Bishop, Sr., J. Mayo Williams; Recorded: April 2, 1941; Label: Decca 8581			
1941	"Saint Vitus Dance"	Composer: Mike Jackson; Recorded: April 2, 1941; Label: Decca 8581			
1942	"I'm Gonna Move to the Outskirts of Town" (Note: Reissued in 1946 on 23628.)	Composer: Andy Razaf, Casey Bill Weldon; Recorded: November 22, 1941; Label: Decca 8593			
1942	"Knock Me a Kiss"	Composer: Mike Jackson; Recorded: November 15, 1941; Label: Decca 8593			
1942	"How 'Bout That?"	Composer: Recorded: November 15, 1941; Label: Decca 8605			
1942	"The Green Grass Grows All Around"	Composer: Arthur Johnson, J. Mayo Williams; Recorded: November 22, 1941; Label: Decca 8605			
1942	"Mama Mama Blues (Rusty Dusty Blues)" (Note: Reissued in 1946 on 23631.)	Composer: J. Mayo Williams; Recorded: November 15, 1941; Label: Decca 8627			
1942	"Small Town Boy"	Composer: Jordan, Dallas Bartley; Recorded: November 22, 1941; Label: Decca 8627			
1942	"I'm Gonna Leave You on the Outskirts of Town"	Composer: Jordan, Clarence Williams; Recorded: July 21, 1942; Label: Decca 8638	3		
1942	"It's a Low Down Dirty Shame"	Composer: (Big Bill Broonzy rec 3/38); Recorded: July 21, 1942; Label: Decca 8638			
1942	"What's the Use of Getting Sober (When You're Gonna Get Drunk Again)" (Note: Reissued in 1946 on 23629.)	Composer: Bubsy Meyers; Recorded: July 21, 1942; Label: Decca 8645	1		
1943	"The Chicks I Pick Are Slender and Tender and Tall"	Composer: Mike Jackson; Recorded: July 21, 1942; Label: Decca 8645	10		
1943	"Five Guys Named Moe" (Note: Reissued in 1946 on 23630.)	Composer: Jerry Bresler, Larry Wynn; Recorded: July 21, 1942; Label: Decca 8653	3		
1943	"That'll Just 'Bout Knock Me Out"	Composer: Jordan, Casey Bill Weldon; Recorded: July 21, 1942; Label: Decca 8653	8		
1943	"Ration Blues" (Note: First crossover hit.)	Composer: Jordan, Collenane Clark, Antonio Cosey; Recorded: October 4, 1943; Label: Decca 8654	1	11	1
1944	"Deacon Jones"	Composer: Hy Heath, Johnny Lange, Richard Loring; Recorded: October 4, 1943; Label: Decca 8654			7
1944	"G.I. Jive"	Composer: Johnny Mercer; Recorded: March 15, 1944; Label: Decca 8659	1	1	
1944	"Is You Is or Is You Ain't (Ma' Baby)"	Composer: Jordan, Billy Austin; Recorded: October 4, 1943; Label: Decca 8659	3	2	1
1945	"Mop! Mop!"	Composer: Claude Demetrius, J. Mayo Williams; Recorded: March 15, 1944; Label: Decca 8668	1		
1945	"You Can't Get That No More"	Composer: Jordan, Sam Theard; Recorded: March 15, 1944; Label: Decca 8668	2	11	
1945	"Caldonia" (Note: Retitled "Caldonia Boogie" for national chart.) (Note: Reissued in 1947 on 23932.)	Composer: F. Moore; Recorded: April 19, 1945; Label: Decca 8670	1	6	
1945	"Somebody Done Changed the Lock on My Door"	Composer: Casey Bill Weldon; Recorded: April 19, 1945; Label: Decca 8670	3		
1945	"My Baby Said Yes (Yip, Yip de Hootie)" (Note: Duet with Bing Crosby.)	Composer: Leo Robin; Recorded: July 1944; Label: Decca 23417		14	
1945	"Your Socks Don't Match"	Composer: Leon Carr, Leo Corday; Recorded: July 1944; Label: Decca 23417			
1946	"Buzz Me"	Composer: F. Moore, Danny Baxter aka Dave Dexter, Jr.; Recorded: January 19, 1945; Label: Decca 18734	1	9	
1946	"Don't Worry 'Bout That Mule"	Composer: F. Moore, C. Stewart, W. Davis, D. Groaner; Recorded: July 18, 1945; Label: Decca 18734	1		
1946	"Salt Pork, West Virginia"	Composer: F. Moore, Bill Tennyson; Recorded: July 16, 1945; Label: Decca 18762	2		
1946	"Reconversion Blues"	Composer: F. Moore, Steve Graham; Recorded: October 15, 1945; Label: Decca 18762	2		
1946	"Beware" (Note: Reissued in 1947 on 23931.)	Composer: F. Moore, Morry Lasco, Dick Adams; Recorded: January 23, 1946; Label: Decca 18818	2	20	
1946	"Don't Let the Sun Catch You Cryin'"	Composer: Joe Greene; Recorded: January 23, 1946; Label: Decca 18818B	3		
1946	"Stone Cold Dead in the Market (He Had It Coming)" (Note: Duet with Ella Fitzgerald.)	Composer: Wilmoth Houdini; Recorded: October 9, 1945; Label: Decca 23546	1	7	
1946	"Petootie Pie"	Composer: Lorenzo Pack, Frank Paparelli, Raymond Leveen; Recorded: October 9, 1945; Label: Decca 23546	3		
1946	"Choo Choo Ch'Boogie"	Composer: Vaughn Horton aka George Vaughn Horton, Denver Darling, Milt Gabler; Recorded: January 23, 1946; Label: Decca 23610	1	7	
1946	"That Chick's Too Young to Fry"	Composer: Tommy Edwards, Jimmy Hillard; Recorded: January 23, 1946; Label: Decca 23610	3		
1946	"Ain't That Just Like a Woman (They'll Do It Every Time)"	Composer: F. Moore, Claude Demetrius; Recorded: January 23, 1946; Label: Decca 23669	1	17	
1946	"If It's Love You Want, Baby That's Me"	Composer: Sid Robin aka Sidney Rabinowitz; Recorded: June 26, 1946; Label: Decca 23669			
1946	"Ain't Nobody Here but Us Chickens"	Composer: Joan Whitney, Alex Kramer; Recorded: June 26, 1946; Label: Decca 23741	1	6	
1946	"Let the Good Times Roll"	Composer: F. Moore, Sam Theard; Recorded: June 26, 1946; Label: Decca 23741	2		
1947	"Texas and Pacific"	Composer: Jack Wolf Fine, Joseph E. Hirsch; Recorded: October 10, 1946; Label: Decca 23810	1	20	
1947	"I Like 'Em Fat Like That"	Composer: Jordan, Claude Demetrius, J. Mayo Williams; Recorded: March 1, 1944; Label: Decca 23810	5		
1947	"Open the Door, Richard!"	Composer: Jack McVea, Dan Howell, Dusty Fletcher, John Mason; Recorded: January 23, 1947; Label: Decca 23841	2	6	
1947	"It's So Easy"	Composer: Allan Roberts, Doris Fisher; Recorded: January 23, 1947; Label: Decca 23841			
1947	"Jack, You're Dead"	Composer: Dick Miles, Walter Bishop, Sr.; Recorded: October 10, 1946; Label: Decca 23901	1	21	
1947	"I Know What You're Puttin' Down"	Composer: Jordan, Bud Allen; Recorded: October 10, 1946; Label: Decca 23901	3		
1947	"Boogie Woogie Blue Plate"	Composer: Joe Bushkin, Johnny DeVries; Recorded: Label: Decca 24104	1	21	
1947	"Sure Had a Wonderful Time"	Composer: F. Moore, Claude Demetrius; Recorded: October 10, 1946; Label: Decca 24104			
1947	"Look Out"	Composer: Jordan, Sid Robin; Recorded: June 4, 1947; Label: Decca 24155	5		
1947	"Early in the Mornin'"	Composer: Jordan, Dallas Bartley, Leo Hickman; Recorded: April 23, 1947; Label: Decca 23155	3		
1948	"Barnyard Boogie"	Composer: Jordan, Wilhelmina Gray; Recorded: April 23, 1947; Label: Decca 24300	2		
1948	"How Long Must I Wait for You"	Composer: Lucky Millinder, Jerry Black; Recorded: July 16, 1945; Label: Decca 24300	9		
1948	"Reet, Petite and Gone"	Composer: Jordan, Lora Lee; Recorded: October 10, 1946; Label: Decca 24381	4		
1948	"Inflation Blues"	Composer: Jordan, Allegretto Alexander, Tommy Southern; Recorded: December 1, 1947; Label: Decca 24381			
1948	"Run Joe"	Composer: Jordan, Walter Merrick, Joe Willoughby; Recorded: April 23, 1947; Label: Decca 24448	1	23	
1948	"All for the Love of Lil"	Composer: Jerry Bresler, Larry Wynn; Recorded: October 10, 1946; Label: Decca 24448	13		
1948	"Don't Burn the Candle at Both Ends"	Composer: Jordan, Benny Carter, Irving Gordon; Recorded: December 19, 1947; Label: Decca 24483	4		
1948	"We Can't Agree"	Composer: Jordan, Wilhelmina Gray; Recorded: November 24, 1947; Label: Decca 24483	14		
1948	"Daddy-O" (Note: Duet with Martha Davis.)	Composer: Don Raye, Gene De Paul; Recorded: December 18, 1947; Label: Decca 24502	7		
1948	"You're on the Right Track, Baby"	Composer: Irving Gordon, Benny Carter; Recorded: December 18, 1947; Label: Decca 24502			
1948	"Pettin' and Pokin'"	Composer: Jordan, Sid Robin; Recorded: December 1, 1947; Label: Decca 24527	5		
1948	"Why'd You Do It, Baby?"	Composer: Recorded: December 18, 1947; Label: Decca 24527			
1949	"Roamin' Blues"	Composer: Jordan, Jeff Dane, Ben Lorre; Recorded: November 24, 1947; Label: Decca 24571	10		
1949	"Have You Got the Gumption?"	Composer: Bill Austin, Pinetop Smith; Recorded: November 24, 1947; Label: Decca 24571			
1949	"You Broke Your Promise"	Composer: Irving Taylor, George Wyle; Recorded: February 1949; Label: Decca 24587	3		
1949	"Safe, Sane and Single"	Composer: Jordan, Hy Heath, Johnny Lange; Recorded: February 7, 1949; Label: Decca 24587			
1949	"Cole Slaw (Sorghum Switch)"	Composer: Jesse Stone; Recorded: April 12, 1949; Label: Decca 24633	7		
1949	"Every Man to His Own Profession"	Composer: Jordan, William J. Tennyson, Jr.; Recorded: April 23, 1949; Label: Decca 24633	10		
1949	"You Run Your Mouth, I’ll Run My Business" (Note: Reissue of 7705.)	Composer: Lil Armstrong; Recorded: January 1940; Label: Decca 24643			
1949	"A Chicken Ain’t Nothin’ but a Bird" (Note: Reissue of 8501.)	Composer: Emmett "Babe" Wallace; Recorded: September 30, 1940; Label: Decca 24643			
1949	"Baby, It's Cold Outside"	Composer: Frank Loesser; Recorded: April 8, 1949; Label: Decca 24644	6	9	
1949	"Don't Cry, Cry Baby"	Composer: Clarence Maher, Bennie Martini, Sail Tepper; Recorded: April 28, 1949; Label: Decca 24644			
1949	"Beans and Corn Bread"	Composer: F. Moore, Fred B. Clark; Recorded: April 12, 1949; Label: Decca 24673	1		
1949	"Chicky-Mo, Craney-Cro"	Composer: Jordan, Wesley Wilson; Recorded: November 24, 1947; Label: Decca 24673			
1949/1950	"Saturday Night Fish Fry (Pts. 1 & 2)"	Composer: Jordan, Ellis Walsh, Al Carters; Recorded: August 9, 1949; Label: Decca 24725	1	21	
Blank in chart positions indicates release that did not chart.

==== V-Discs ====
Year	Title	Details	Peak chart positions
Year	Title	Details	(Note: Not applicable.)
1943	"Is You Is or Is You Ain't My Baby"	Composer: Jordan, Billy Austin; Recorded: Label: V-Disc 158	
1943	"Knock Me a Kiss"	Composer: Mike Jackson; Recorded: Label: V-Disc 158	
1942	"I'm Gonna Move to the Outskirts of Town"	Composer: Andy Razaf, Casey Bill Weldon; Recorded: Label: V-Disc 175	
1943	"I've Found a New Baby"	Composer: Jack Palmer, Spencer Williams; Recorded: Label: V-Disc 175	
1943	"Five Guys Named Moe"	Composer: Jerry Bresler, Larry Wynn; Recorded: Label: V-Disc 196	
1943	"Jumpin' at the Jubilee"	Composer: Jordan; Recorded: Label: V-Disc 196	
1943	"You Can't Get That No More"	Composer: Jordan, Sam Theard; Recorded: Label: V-Disc 237	
1943	"The End of My Worry"	Composer: Jordan; Recorded: Label: V-Disc 237	
1944	"How High Am I"	Composer: Jordan, J. Mayo Williams; Recorded: Label: V-Disc 376	
1944	"Hey Now Let's Live"	Composer: Jordan, J. Mayo Williams; Recorded: Label: V-Disc 376	
1944	"Deacon Jones"	Composer: Hy Heath, Johnny Lange, Richard Long; Recorded: Label: V-Disc 478	
1944	"I Like 'Em Fat Like That"	Composer: Jordan, Claude Demetrius, J. Mayo Williams; Recorded: Label: V-Disc 478	
1944	"Bahama Joe"	Composer: F. Moore; Recorded: Label: V-Disc 513	
1944	"Nobody but Me"	Composer: F. Moore; Recorded: Label: V-Disc 513	

=== 1950s ===
Year	Title	Details	Peak chart positions (Note: Whitburn 1988, pp. 230)		
Year	Title	Details	R&B	Pop	C&W
1950	"School Days"	Composer: Gus Edwards, Will D. Cobb; Recorded: April 28, 1949; Label: Decca 24815	5		
1950	"I Know What I've Got"	Composer: Jordan, Sid Robin aka Sidney Rabinowitz; Recorded: February 1949; Label: Decca 24815			
1950	"Push-Ka-Pee Shee Pie"	Composer: Jordan, Walter Merrick, Joe Willoughby; Recorded: April 12, 1949; Label: Decca 24877			
1950	"Hungry Man"	Composer: Bobby Troup; Recorded: August 9, 1949; Label: Decca 24877			
1950	"Baby's Gonna Go Bye Bye"	Composer: Dave Franklin, Van Alexander; Recorded: April 12, 1949; Label: Decca 24981			
1950	"Heed My Warning"	Composer: Jordan, Howard Bowman; Recorded: April 12, 1949; Label: Decca 24981			
1950	"Pinetop's Boogie Woogie" (Note: Reissue of 8525.)	Composer: Pinetop Smith; Recorded: January 24, 1941; Label: Decca 25394			
1950	"Saxa-Woogie" (Note: Reissue of 8560.)	Composer: Jordan; Recorded: April 2, 1941; Label: Decca 25394			
1950	"Honeysuckle Rose" (Note: Reissue of 7675.)	Composer: Fats Waller, Andy Razaf; Recorded: November 14, 1939; Label: Decca 25473			
1950	"T-Bone Blues"	Composer: T-Bone Walker, Les Hite; Recorded: January 24, 1941; Label: Decca 25473			
1950	"Onion"	Composer: Jordan, Bill Doggett; Recorded: April 12, 1949; Label: Decca 27058			
1950	"Psycho-Loco"	Composer: Jordan, Bill Doggett; Recorded: April 12, 1949; Label: Decca 27058			
1950	"Blue Light Boogie (Pts. 1 & 2)"	Composer: Jessie Mae Robinson; Recorded: June 25, 1950; Label: Decca 27114	1		
1950	"I Want a Roof Over My Head"	Composer: Brooks, Harvey; Recorded: June 26, 1950; Label: Decca 27129			
1950	"Show Me How (You Milk the Cow)"	Composer: Nicola Paone; Recorded: June 26, 1950; Label: Decca 27129			
1950	"I'll Never Be Free"	Composer: Bennie Benjamin, George David Weiss; Recorded: August 1950; Label: Decca 27200	7		
1950	"Ain’t Nobody’s Business but My Own"	Composer: Porter Grainger, Everett Robbins; Recorded: August 1950; Label: Decca 27200			
1950	"Tamburitza Boogie"	Composer: Steve Crlencia, George Vaughn aka George Vaughn Horton; Recorded: August 18, 1950; Label: Decca 27203	10		
1950	"Trouble Then Satisfaction"	Composer: George Vaughn aka George Vaughn Horton, Matthew Strange; Recorded: August 21, 1950; Label: Decca 27203			
1950	"Life Is So Peculiar" (Note: Duet with Louis Armstrong.)	Composer: Jimmy Van Heusen, Johnny Burke; Recorded: August 23, 1950 New York City; Label: Decca 27212			
1950	"(I'll Be Glad When You're Dead) You, Rascal You" (Note: Duet with Louis Armstrong.)	Composer: Sam Theard; Recorded: Label: Decca 27212			
1951	"Lemonade"	Composer: Jordan, Wilhelmina Gray; Recorded: Aust 18, 1950; Label: Decca 27324	6		
1951	"(You Dyed Your Hair) Chartreuse"	Composer: Billy Moore, Jr., J. Leslie McFarland; Recorded: August 18, 1950; Label: Decca 27324			
1951	"Tear Drops from My Eyes"	Composer: Rudy Toombs; Recorded: December 21, 1950; Label: Decca 27428	4		
1951	"It's a Great, Great Pleasure"	Composer: Jordan, William J. Tennyson, Jr.; Recorded: August 18, 1950; Label: Decca 27428			
1951	"Weak Minded Blues"	Composer: Jordan; Recorded: March 15, 1951; Label: Decca 27547	5		
1951	"Is My Pop in There?"	Composer: Brooke Taylor, Wayne Vaughn; Recorded: March 1951; Label: Decca 27547			
1951	"I Can't Give You Anything but Love, Baby"	Composer: Dorothy Fields, Jimmy McHugh; Recorded: March 1, 1951; Label: Decca 27620			
1951	"You Will Always Have a Friend"	Composer: Jordan, Joe Willoughby; Recorded: August 1950; Label: Decca 27620			
1951	"If You're So Smart How Come You Ain't Rich"	Composer: Fred Norman, Billy Friedman, Walter Bishop, Sr.; Recorded: June 5, 1951; Label: Decca 27648			
1951	"How Blue Can You Get?"	Composer: Jane Feather; Recorded: June 1951; Label: Decca 27648			
1951	"Please Don't Leave Me"	Composer: Recorded: June 13, 1951; Label: Decca 27694			
1951	"Three-Handed Woman"	Composer: Ben Raleigh, Hilda Taylor; Recorded: June 13, 1951; Label: Decca 27694			
1951	"Trust in Me"	Composer: Recorded: June 5, 1951; Label: Decca 27784			
1951	"Cock-a-Doodle Doo"	Composer: Vaughn Horton aka George Vaughn Horton; Recorded: July 30, 1951; Label: Decca 27784			
1951	"May Every Day Be Christmas"	Composer: Jordan; Recorded: June 1951; Label: Decca 27806			
1951	"Bone Dry"	Composer: Walt Barrows, Bernard Zee, Libby Zee; Recorded: June 13, 1951; Label: Decca 27806			
1952	"Lay Something on the Bar (Besides Your Elbows)"	Composer: Billy Austin, Sheldon Smith; Recorded: November 28, 1951; Label: Decca 27898			
1952	"No Sale"	Composer: Recorded: June 26, 1946; Label: Decca 27898			
1951	"Louisville Lodge Meeting"	Composer: Ervin Drake, Jimmy Shirl; Recorded: June 5, 1951; Label: Decca 27969			
1951	"Work Baby Work"	Composer: Jack Adrian; Recorded: November 28, 1951; Label: Decca 27969			
1952	"Slow Down"	Composer: Jordan, Russell Royster; Recorded: November 1951; Label: Decca 28088			
1952	"Never Trust a Woman"	Composer: Jordan, Bill Doggett; Recorded: November 1951; Label: Decca 28088			
1952	"Junco Partner"	Composer: Bob Shad, Robert Ellen; Recorded: April 1952; Label: Decca 28211			
1952	"Azure-Te"	Composer: Wild Bill Davis, Don Wolf; Recorded: April 1952; Label: Decca 28211			
1952	"Oil Well, Texas"	Composer: Jordan, Elton Hill, Bill Tennyson; Recorded: April 1952; Label: Decca 28225			
1952	"Jordan for President"	Composer: Jordan; Recorded: May 1952; Label: Decca 28225			
1952	"Friendship"	Composer: Jordan, Claude Demetrius; Recorded: January 20, 1947; Label: Decca 28444			
1952	"You're Much Too Fat"	Composer: Jordan, Ben Lorre, Jeff Dane; Recorded: December 1, 1947; Label: Decca 28444			
1953	"You Didn't Want Me Baby"	Composer: F. Moore; Recorded: December 1952; Label: Decca 28543			
1953	"A Man's Best Friend"	Composer: Ray McKinley; Recorded: December 1952; Label: Decca 28543			
1953	"It's Better to Wait for Love"	Composer: Walter Bishop, Sr.; Recorded: February 1952; Label: Decca 28664			
1953	"Just Like a Butterfly"	Composer: Mort Dixon, Harry Woods; Recorded: February 1952; Label: Decca 28664			
1953	"Hog Wash"	Composer: Jordan, Bill Tennyson; Recorded: May 1953; Label: Decca 28756			
1953	"House Party"	Composer: Jordan, Rose Marie McCoy, Julian Dash, George Kelly; Recorded: May 1953; Label: Decca 28543			
1953	"Time Marches On" (Note: Reissued as 30223.)	Composer: Jordan, Joe Willoughby; Recorded: April 1952; Label: Decca 28820			
1953	"There Must Be a Way"	Composer: David Saxon, Sammy Gallop; Recorded: July 1952; Label: Decca 28820			
1953	"I Want You to Be My Baby"	Composer: Jon Hendricks; Recorded: June 28, 1953; Label: Decca 28883			
1953	"You Know It Too"	Composer: Jordan, Earlie Walsh; Recorded: June 28, 1953; Label: Decca 28883			
1953	"The Soona Baby"	Composer: Jordan, Bill Doggett, Arthur Johnston; Recorded: December 3, 1952; Label: Decca 28982			
1953	"Fat Sam from Birmingham"	Composer: Bob Astor, George Williams; Recorded: June 1951; Label: Decca 28983			
1954	"Nobody Knows You When You're Down and Out"	Composer: Jimmy Cox; Recorded: January 4, 1954; Label: Decca 29018			
1954	"Lollypop"	Composer: Recorded: January 4, 1954; Label: Decca 29018			
1954	"Only Yesterday"	Composer: Recorded: February 1953; Label: Decca 29166			
1954	"I Didn't Know What Time It Was"	Composer: Lorenz Hart, Richard Rodgers; Recorded: February 1953; Label: Decca 29166			
1954	"If It's True"	Composer: Gus Bentley, Don Redman; Recorded: January 2, 1954; Label: Decca 29263			
1954	"Wake Up Jacob"	Composer: Gene DePaul, Don Raye; Recorded: January 1, 1954; Label: Decca 29263			
1954	"Locked Up"	Composer: George Kelly, Wayne Watts, Sidney Wyche; Recorded: January 4, 1954; Label: Decca 29424			
1954	"Perdido"	Composer: Juan Tizol; Recorded: January 1, 1954; Label: Decca 29424			
1954	"I Want You To Be My Baby" (Note: Reissue of 28883.)	Composer: Jon Hendricks; Recorded: June 28, 1953; Label: Decca 29655			
1954	"Come And Get It"	Composer: Alfred Cobbs; Recorded: November 1951; Label: Decca 29655			
1954	"I Gotta Move"	Composer: Mamie Thomas, Leroy Kirkland; Recorded: January 1954; Label: Decca 29860			
1954	"Everything That's Made of Wood (Was Once a Tree)"	Composer: Jordan, Walter Bishop, Sr.; Recorded: May 1953; Label: Decca 29860			
1954	"Time Marches On" (Note: Reissue of 28820.)	Composer: Jordan, Joe Willoughby; Recorded: April 1952; Label: Decca 30223			
1954	"Run Joe" (Note: Reissue of 24448.)	Composer: Jordan, Dr. Walt Merrick, Joe Willoughby; Recorded: April 23, 1947; Label: Decca 30223			
1954	“Whiskey Do Your Stuff”	Composer: John Willie Henry aka Shifty Henry; Recorded: January 1954; Label: Aladdin 3223			
1954	“Dad Gum Ya Hide, Boy”	Composer: Browley Guy, Jr.; Recorded: January 1954; Label: Aladdin 3223			
1954	“I’ll Die Happy”	Composer: Jon Hendricks, Connie Moore; Recorded: February 1954; Label: Aladdin 3227			
1954	“Ooo-Wee”	Composer: Howard Biggs, Thomas; Recorded: January 1954; Label: Aladdin 3227			
1954	“A Dollar Down”	Composer: Jesse Stone; Recorded: February 1954; Label: Aladdin 3243			
1954	“Hurry Home”	Composer: Buddy Bernier, Bob Emmerich, Joseph Meyer; Recorded:April 1954; Label: Aladdin 3243			
1954	“I Seen Watcha Done”	Composer: Jordan; Recorded: January 1954; Label: Aladdin 3246			
1954	“Messy Bessy”	Composer: Jon Hendricks; Recorded: February 1954; Label: Aladdin 3246			
1954	“Louie's Blues”	Composer: Jordan; Recorded: February 1954; Label: Aladdin 3249			
1954	“If I Had Any Sense, I’d Go Back Home”	Composer: Rosemarie McCoy; Recorded: April 1954; Label: Aladdin 3249			
1954	“Yeah, Yeah Baby!”	Composer: Rudy Toombs; Recorded: February 1954; Label: Aladdin 3264			
1954	“Put Some Money in the Pot, Boy (‘Cause the Juice is Running Low)”	Composer: Adelia Davis; Recorded: February 1954; Label: Aladdin 3264			
1954	“Fat Back and Corn Liquor”	Composer: Rudy Toombs; Recorded: February 1954; Label: Aladdin 3270			
1954	“The Dripper”	Composer: Jordan; Recorded: January 1954; Label: Aladdin 3270			
1954	“Gal, You Need a Whippin’”	Composer: Jordan, Antonio Cosey; Recorded: January 1954; Label: Aladdin 3279			
1954	“Time is a Passin’”	Composer: Jordan; Recorded: January 1954; Label: Aladdin 3279			
1954	“Gotta Go”	Composer: Jordan; Recorded: February 1954; Label: Aladdin 3295			
1954	“It’s Hard to be Good Without You”	Composer: Jordan, Chester Lane, Lucille Aggers, Recorded: January 1954; Label: Aladdin 3295			
1955	“Whatever Lola Wants (Lola Gets)”	Composer: Richard Adler, Jerry Ross; Recorded: March 18, 1955; Label: X 0116			
1955	“It’s Been Said”	Composer: Nellie Lutcher; Recorded: March 18, 1955; Label: X 0116			
1955	“Bananas”	Composer: Bennie Benjamin, George David Weiss; Recorded: March 18, 1955; Label: X 0148			
1955	“Baby Let’s Do It Up”	Composer: Winfield Scott; Recorded: March 18, 1955; Label: X 0148			
1955	“Chicken Back”	Composer: Ernie Hays, Timmie Rogers, Joe Taylor; Recorded: October 18, 1955; Label: X 0182			
1955	“Where Can I Go?”	Composer: Jordan, Clyde Jones; Recorded: October 18, 1955; Label: X 0182			
1955	“Rock 'n Roll Call”	Composer: Jack Hammer aka Earl Burroughs, Rudy Toombs; Recorded: October 18, 1955; Label: Vik 0192			
1955	“Baby, You’re Just Too Much”	Composer: Aaron Schroeder; Recorded: October 18, 1955; Label: Vik 0192			
1956	“Big Bess”	Composer: Teddy McCrae, Mamie Thomas; Recorded: October 23, 1956; Label: Mercury 70993			
1956	“Cat Scratchin’”	Composer: R. Refond; Recorded: October 23, 1956; Label: Mercury 70993			
1956	"Ain't Nobody Here but Us Chickens (remake)	Composer: Joan Whitney, Alex Kramer; Recorded: 1956; Label: Mercury 71023			
1956	"Choo Choo Ch'Boogie" (remake)	Composer:Vaughn Horton aka George Vaughn Horton, Denver Darling, Milt Gabler; Recorded: 1956; Label: Mercury 71023			
1957	“Rock Doc”	Composer: Allman, Lloyd Shaffer; Recorded: January 25, 1957; Label: Mercury 71052			
1957	“Morning Light”	Composer: Don Benoliel, Jerry Ragovoy; Recorded: January 25, 1957; Label: Mercury 71052			
1957	“Fire”	Composer: Jordan, Brook Benton; Recorded: January 25, 1957; Label: Mercury 71106			
1957	“Ella Mae”	Composer: Mayme Watts; Recorded: 1957; Label: Mercury 71106			
1957	"I Found My Piece of Mind"	Composer: Pee Wee Crayton; Recorded: 1957; Label: Mercury 71206			
1957	"I Never Had a Chance"	Composer: Irving Berlin; Recorded: 1957; Label: Mercury 71206			
1958	“Sweet Hunk of Junk”	Composer: Recorded: June 9, 1958; Label:Mercury 71319			
1958	“Wish I Could Make Some Money”	Composer: Recorded: June 9, 1958; Label: Mercury 71319			
Blank in chart positions indicates release that did not chart.

=== 1960s ===
Year	Title	Details	Peak chart positions (Note: Whitburn 1988, p. 230)		
Year	Title	Details	R&B	Pop	C&W
1960	"Bills"	Composer: Leslie Butler, Dossie Terry; Recorded: Label: Warwick M–583			
1960	"Fifty Cents"	Composer: Recorded: Label: Warwick M–583			
1962	"You're My Mule"	Composer: Jordan, William Jones, Lawrence Washington; Recorded: Label: Tangerine 924			
1962	"Texarkana Twist"	Composer: D. DeLuca, F. Jordan; Recorded: Label: Tangerine 924			
1962	"Workin' Man"	Composer: Recorded: Label: Tangerine 926			
1962	"The Meeting"	Composer: Recorded: Label: Tangerine 926			
1963	"Hardhead"	Composer: Eddie Curtis; Recorded: Label: Tangerine 930		128	
1963	"Never Know When a Cheating Woman Changes Her Mind"	Composer: Floyd Dixon; Recorded: Label: Tangerine 930			
1963	"Don't Send Me Flowers When I'm in the Graveyard"	Composer: Floyd Dixon; Recorded: Label: Tangerine 933			
1963	"Point of No Return"	Composer: Carole King, Gerry Goffin; Recorded: Label: Tangerine 933			
1964	"What I Say" (Note: Ray Charles' "What'd I Say" with different lyrics.)	Composer: Ray Charles; Recorded: Label: Tangerine 937			
1964	"Old Age"	Composer: Jordan, Mabel Davis, Ray Charles; Recorded: Label: Tangerine 937			
1964	"Time Is Running Out"	Composer: Recorded: Label: Tangerine 942			
1964	"Troubadour"	Composer: Recorded: Label: Tangerine 942			
1964	"Ain't Nobody Here but Us Chickens" (remake)	Composer: Joan Whitney, Alex Kramer; Recorded: Label: Tangerine 947			
1964	"Saturday Nite Fish Fry" (remake)	Composer: Jordan, Ellis Walsh, Al Carters; Recorded: Label: Tangerine 947			
1965	"Comin' Down"	Composer: Bobby Darin, Howlett Smith; Recorded: Label: Tangerine 958			
1965	"65 Bars"	Composer: Don Padgett, Howlett Smith; Recorded: Label: Tangerine 958			
1968	"Amen Corner"	Composer: Teddy Edwards; Recorded: Label: Pzazz 004			
1968	"Watch The World"	Composer: Lynn Brown; Recorded: Label: Pzazz 004			
1968	"Santa Claus, Santa Claus"	Composer: Teddy Edwards; Recorded: Label: Pzazz 015			
1968	"Sakatumi"	Composer: Stanley Myers; Recorded: Label: Pzazz 015			
Blank in chart positions indicates release that did not chart.

== Albums ==
=== Studio albums ===
- Somebody Up There Digs Me (Mercury MG-20242, 1957)
- Man, We're Wailin' (Mercury MG-20331, 1958)
- One Sided Love – Then Sakatumi (Pzazz LP-321, 1968)
- I Believe in Music (Disques Black And Blue 33.059, 1973; CD reissue: Black & Blue BB-876, 1996)

=== Live albums ===
- Live Jive (A Touch of Magic 4, 1994)

=== Compilation albums ===
- The Best of Louis Jordan (MCA 2-4079, 1975; CD reissue: 1989)
- Five Guys Named Moe (Original Decca Recordings, Vol. 2) (MCA 10503, 1992)
- Let the Good Times Roll (The Complete Decca Recordings 1938–1954) (Bear Family BCD-15557, 1992) 9-CD
- Louis Jordan on Film 1942–1948 (Krazy Kat KKCD-17, 1996)
- Let the Good Times Roll (The Anthology 1938–1954) (MCA/Decca 2-11907, 1999) 2-CD
- Jivin' with Jordan (Proper BOX 47, 2002) 4-CD
- The Aladdin, "X" & Vik Recordings 1953–1955 (Rev-Ola CRBAND-2, 2006)
- Roc Doc! Louis Jordan on Mercury 1956–1957 Rev-Ola CRREV-244, 2008)
