= Let the Good Times Roll (album) =

Studio album by B. B. King
- Released: October 5, 1999
- Studio: Cello (Los Angeles, California)
- Genre: Jump blues, Rhythm & blues, Swing revival
- Length: 60:08
- Label: MCA
- Producer: Stewart Levine

B. B. King chronology
Live in Japan (1999)	Let the Good Times Roll (1999)	Riding with the King (2000)

Let the Good Times Roll: The Music of Louis Jordan is the thirty seventh studio album by B. B. King, released in 1999. It is a tribute album to jazz saxophonist and singer Louis Jordan, and is made up entirely of covers of songs written or performed by Jordan. The album was released in 1999 on MCA Records.

As well as King, the album features other jazz and blues musicians including Dr. John, Earl Palmer and members of Ray Charles' band.

== Background ==
B.B. King commented on Jordan, stating, "He was the first to achieve success with rhythm and blues during the big band and swing era" and "He was also the first rapper in history. His raps and rhymes made people laugh, but above all, they made people eager to dance."

In addition to Dr. John guesting on piano, he also performed a duet with King on the track "Is You Is or Is You Ain't (My Baby)?" The horn section, consisting of Hank Crawford, David "Fathead" Newman, and Marcus Belgrave, was also known for their collaborations with Ray Charles.

== Reception ==
Professional ratings
Review scores
Source	Rating
AllMusic	4/5 stars
Artistdirect	4/5 stars
The Penguin Guide to Blues Recordings	3/4 stars

In the United States, the album did not enter the Billboard 200 overall chart, but it reached number two on Billboard's Blues Albums chart. In New Zealand, it spent a total of three weeks in the top 40 of the album chart, peaking at number 29.

Stephen Thomas Erlewine of AllMusic gave the album four out of five stars, stating, "King has never produced a work as raw and fervent as Jordan, but his tribute to Jordan is evident from the first track." He also noted, "Strangely, King does not play much guitar on this album, focusing instead on vocals and interaction with the band. The guitar solos are as smooth and flavorful as ever, but the focus is always on the vocals."

At the 43rd Grammy Awards, the track "Is You Is or Is You Ain’t (My Baby)?" won the award for Best Pop Collaboration with Vocals, performed as a duet with Dr. John.

== Track listing ==
1. "Ain't Nobody Here But Us Chickens" (Joan Whitney Kramer, Alex Kramer) - 2:51
2. "Is You Is or Is You Ain't My Baby" (Billy Austin, Louis Jordan) - 3:22
3. "Beware, Brother, Beware" (Dick Adams / Morry Lasco / Fleecie Moore)- 3:07
4. "Somebody Done Changed the Lock on My Door" (William "Casey Bill" Weldon) - 3:28
5. "Ain't That Just Like a Woman (They'll Do It Every Time)" (Claude Demetrius / Fleecie Moore)- 3:30
6. "Choo Choo Ch'Boogie" (Vaughn Horton / Denver Darling / Milt Gabler) - 2:37
7. "Buzz Me" (Danny Baxter / Fleecie Moore)- 2:52
8. "Early in the Mornin'" (Louis Jordan / Leo Hickman / Dallas Bartley) - 4:47
9. "I'm Gonna Move to the Outskirts of Town" (Andy Razaf / William "Casey Bill" Weldon) - 4:49
10. "Jack, You're Dead" (Dick Miles / Walter Bishop) - 2:09
11. "Knock Me a Kiss" (Mike Jackson / Andy Razaf) - 2:40
12. "Let the Good Times Roll" (Fleecie Moore / Sam Theard) - 2:39
13. "Caldonia" (Fleecie Moore) - 2:17
14. "It's a Great, Great Pleasure" (Louis Jordan / William Tennyson Jr.) - 2:38
15. "Rusty Dusty Blues (Mama Mama Blues)" (J. Mayo Williams) - 4:17
16. "Sure Had a Wonderful Time Last Night" (Claude Demetrius / Fleecie Moore)- 3:07
17. "Saturday Night Fish Fry" (Ellis Walsh / Louis Jordan) - 4:24
18. "Nobody Knows You When You're Down and Out" (Jimmy Cox) - 4:34

== Personnel ==
- B.B. King – lead vocals, lead guitar
- Dr. John – piano, additional vocals
- Neil Larsen – Hammond organ, piano
- Hank Crawford – alto saxophone
- David "Fathead" Newman – tenor saxophone
- Marcus Belgrave – trumpet
- Russell Malone – rhythm guitar
- John Heard – bass guitar
- Earl Palmer – drums
- Lenny Castro – percussion
