= Joe Jackson's Jumpin' Jive =

Studio album by Joe Jackson
- Released: 19 June 1981
- Recorded: May 1981
- Studios: Basing Street, London
- Genres: Jump blues, swing revival
- Length: 42:17
- Label: A&M
- Producer: Joe Jackson

Joe Jackson chronology
Beat Crazy (1980)	Joe Jackson's Jumpin' Jive (1981)	Night and Day (1982)

1998 remastered edition cover art

Joe Jackson's Jumpin' Jive is the fourth studio album by Joe Jackson. Released in 1981, it is a collection of covers of classic 1940s swing and jump blues songs originally performed by musicians such as Louis Jordan and Cab Calloway, the latter of whose song "Jumpin' Jive" was the eponym for this album.

The album and single were credited to Joe Jackson's Jumpin' Jive.

A remastered edition was released in late 1998.

== Critical reception ==
Professional ratings
Review scores
Source	Rating
AllMusic	4.5/5 stars
The Rolling Stone Album Guide	3.5/5 stars

The Rolling Stone Album Guide deemed the album "the best of Jackson's stylistic jaunts."

== Track listing ==
No.	Title	Writer(s)	Length
1.	"Jumpin' with Symphony Sid"	Lester Young, King Pleasure	2:43
2.	"Jack, You're Dead"	Walter Bishop, Dick Miles	2:46
3.	"Is You Is or Is You Ain't My Baby"	Bill Austin, Louis Jordan	4:57
4.	"We the Cats (Shall Hep Ya)"	Cab Calloway, Jack Palmer	3:19
5.	"San Francisco Fan"	Sammy Mysels, Dick Sanford	4:28
6.	"Five Guys Named Moe"	Jerome Bresler, Larry Wynn	2:30
7.	"Jumpin' Jive"	Cab Calloway, Frank Froeba, Jack Palmer	2:41
8.	"You Run Your Mouth (and I'll Run My Business)"	Lil Armstrong	2:31
9.	"What's the Use of Getting Sober (When You're Gonna Get Drunk Again)"	Busby Meyers	3:46
10.	"You're My Meat"	Skeets Tolbert	2:54
11.	"Tuxedo Junction"	Erskine Hawkins, Buddy Feyne, William Johnson, Julian Dash	5:18
12.	"How Long Must I Wait for You"	Jerry Black, Lucky Millinder	4:06

== Personnel ==
Musicians

- Joe Jackson – vocals and vibraphone
- Pete Thomas – alto saxophone
- Raul D'Oliveira – trumpet
- Nick Weldon – piano
- Dave Bitelli – tenor saxophone and clarinet
- Graham Maby – bass
- Larry Tolfree – drums
- All – backing vocals

Production

- Joe Jackson - arrangements, producer
- Norman Mighell - assistant producer, recording engineer
- Matt The Goose - assistant recording engineer
- Joe Jackson, Pete Thomas, Dave Bitelli, Raul D'Oliveira - horn arrangements
- Jeri Heiden and Sandy Brummels - art direction
- Anton Corbijn - photography

== Charts ==
Chart (1981)	Peak position
Australia (Kent Music Report)	29
New Zealand Albums (RMNZ)	12
UK Albums (Official Charts)	14
US Billboard 200	42
