= Billboard Most-Played Race Records of 1946 =

Billboard Most-Played Race Records of 1946 is a year-end chart compiled by Billboard magazine ranking the year's top race records based on the number of times the record was played on the nation's juke boxes. Billboard assigned point totals to each record based on its juke box plays, much like with its weekly Most-Played Juke Box Race Records chart.

"Hey! Ba-Ba-Re-Bop" from Lionel Hampton & His Orchestra was the year's No. 1 record with 120 points, ranking more than 40 points higher than any other record.

Louis Jordan and His Tympany Five led all other artists with 11 records on the year-end chart, including "Choo Choo Ch'Boogie" (No. 2) and "Stone Cold Dead in the Market (He Had It Coming)" with Ella Fitzgerald (No. 3). Billboard ranked Jordan's band as the year's top race record band with 385 points, more than triple the total of the second place band (Lionel Hampton & His Orchestra with 128 points).

Decca Records led all other labels with 17 records, including the top four, on the year-end chart. Capitol Records ranked second with five records followed by RCA Victor (four) and Exclusive (three).

| Rank | Title | Artist(s) | Label | Points |
|---|---|---|---|---|
| 1 | "Hey! Ba-Ba-Re-Bop" | Lionel Hampton & His Orchestra | Decca | 120 |
| 2 | "Choo Choo Ch'Boogie" | Louis Jordan & His Tympany Five | Decca | 79 |
| 3 | "Stone Cold Dead in the Market (He Had It Coming)" | Ella Fitzgerald, Louis Jordan & His Tympany Five | Decca | 63 |
| 4 | "The Gypsy" | The Ink Spots | Decca | 53 |
| 5 | "R. M. Blues" | Roy Milton & His Solid Senders | Juke Box, Specialty | 50 |
| 6 | "Buzz Me" | Louis Jordan & His Tympany Five | Decca | 48 |
| 7 | "Drifting Blues" | Johnny Moore's Three Blazers | Philo | 47 |
| 8 | "Salt Pork, West Virginia" | Louis Jordan & His Tympany Five | Decca | 44 |
| 9 | "I Know" | Andy Kirk & His Orchestra with The Jubalaires | Decca | 41 |
| 10 | "Ain't That Just Like a Woman (They'll Do It Every Time)" | Louis Jordan & His Tympany Five | Decca | 34 |
| 11 | "Don't Worry 'Bout That Mule" | Louis Jordan & His Tympany Five | Decca | 32 |
| 12 | "(Get Your Kicks on) Route 66" | The King Cole Trio | Capitol | 27 |
| 13 | "Beware" | Louis Jordan & His Tympany Five | Decca | 26 |
| 14 | "Reconversion Blues" | Louis Jordan & His Tympany Five | Decca | 20 |
| 15 | "Don't Be a Baby, Baby" | The Mills Brothers | Decca | 18 |
| 15 | "That Chick's Too Young to Fry" | Louis Jordan & His Tympany Five | Decca | 18 |
| 16 | "I've Got a Right to Cry" | Joe Liggins & His Honeydrippers | Exclusive | 16 |
| 16 | "Don't Let the Sun Catch You Cryin'" | Louis Jordan & His Tympany Five | Decca | 16 |
| 16 | "I Know Who Threw the Whiskey (In the Well)" | Bull Moose Jackson & His Orchestra | Queen | 16 |
| 17 | "I've Got a Right to Cry" | Erskine Hawkins | RCA Victor | 15 |
| 17 | "Tanya" | Joe Liggins & His Honeydrippers | Exclusive | 15 |
| 18 | "Sunny Road" | Roosevelt Sykes with his Original Honeydrippers | RCA Victor | 12 |
| 19 | "The Christmas Song" | The King Cole Trio | Capitol | 9 |
| 20 | "Beulah's Boogie" | Lionel Hampton & His Orchestra | Decca | 8 |
| 20 | "Shorty's Got to Go" | Lucky Millinder & His Orchestra | Decca | 8 |
| 20 | "Gotta Gimme Whatcha Got" | Julia Lee & Her Boy Friends | Capitol | 8 |
| 20 | "(I Love You) For Sentimental Reasons" | The King Cole Trio | Capitol | 8 |
| 21 | "The Honeydripper" | Joe Liggins & His Honeydrippers | Exclusive | 7 |
| 21 | "Be-Baba-Leba" | Helen Humes | Philo | 7 |
| 22 | "Voo-It! Voo-It!" | The Blues Woman | Juke Box | 6 |
| 22 | "After Hours" | Erskine Hawkins & His Orchestra | RCA Victor | 6 |
| 23 | "Playful Baby" | Wynonie Harris with Johnnie Alston & His All Stars | Apollo | 5 |
| 23 | "The Very Thought of You" | Luis Russell & His Orchestra | Apollo | 5 |
| 23 | "So Glad You're Mine" | Arthur "Big Boy" Crudup | RCA Victor | 5 |
| 23 | "Ain't Nobody Here But Us Chickens" | Louis Jordan & His Tympany Five | Decca | 5 |
| 24 | "Buzz Me" | Ella Mae Morse with Billy May's Orchestra | Capitol | 4 |
| 24 | "Prisoner of Love" | Billy Eckstine & His Orchestra | National | 4 |

== See also ==
- Billboard year-end top pop records of 1946
- Billboard Most-Played Folk Records of 1946
- 1946 in music
