= Beware =

Beware may refer to:

- Beware (Bonnie Prince Billy album), a 2009 album
- Beware! (Barry White album), a 1981 album
- Beware (The Funk Is Everywhere), 1986 album by Afrika Bambaataa
- Beware, US title of Panjabi MC's 2003 album The Album
- Beware (EP), a 1980 EP by the Misfits
- Beware (film), a 1946 American film directed by Bud Pollard
- "Beware" (Big Sean song), 2013
- Beware (Louis Jordan song), 1946
- "Beware'", a 1998 song by Big Pun from the album Capital Punishment
- "Beware'", a 2006 song by Deftones from the album Saturday Night Wrist
- "Beware", a 2008 song by Sugababes from the album Catfights and Spotlights
- "Beware", a 2011 song by Death Grips from the mixtape Exmilitary
- "Beware", a 2020 song by Iz*One from the album Twelve
