= Floyd Morgenstern =

American composer (1910–1984)

- Born: Floyd Victor Morgenstern; June 25, 1910; O'Fallon, Illinois, United States
- Died: October 11, 1984 (aged 74); San Francisco, California, United States
- Occupation: Composer

Floyd Victor Morgenstern (June 25, 1910 – October 11, 1984) was an American composer, pianist, and music teacher.

Morgenstern was born in O'Fallon, Illinois. He received a scholarship to study at the Juilliard Institute of Music. In 1933 he played a recital of his own compositions on CBS' Andre Kostelanetz Presents. He studied film music at Paramount Studios in 1938. He died in San Francisco.

One of his compositions was entered in the music event in the art competition at the 1932 Summer Olympics.

== Selected Compositions ==
- Shades of Gray (1936), co-written with Walter Bishop
