= Fine and Mellow (Ruth Brown album) =

Studio album by Ruth Brown
- Released: 1991
- Genre: R&B, blues
- Label: Fantasy
- Producer: Ralph Jungheim

Ruth Brown chronology
Brown, Black & Beautiful (1990)	Fine and Mellow (1991)	The Songs of My Life (1993)

Fine and Mellow is an album by the American musician Ruth Brown, released in 1991. After recuperating from leg surgery, Brown supported the album with several concert appearances.

== Production ==
Fine and Mellow is an album of Brown's favorite songs. Produced by Ralph Jungheim, it was recorded with session musicians in New York City and in Hollywood. The songs were arranged by Frank Owens. Rodney Jones played guitar; Herman Riley contributed on saxophone. The title track was written by Billie Holiday. "Salty Papa Blues" is a version of the song made famous by Dinah Washington. "It's Just a Matter of Time" is a cover of the Brook Benton song. "Knock Me a Kiss" is a cover of the song made famous by Louis Jordan.

== Critical reception ==
Professional ratings
Review scores
Source	Rating
AllMusic	4/5 stars
The Grove Press Guide to the Blues on CD	4/5 stars
North County Times	3/4 stars
The Philadelphia Inquirer	2.5/4 stars
The Virgin Encyclopedia of R&B and Soul	3/4 stars

Newsday wrote that Brown's "brash style never adapts to songs synonymous with other singers, but adopts them as her own." The Los Angeles Times said that the album "underlines her versatility and her ability to use an actor's touch to inject drama or humor into a song." The Vancouver Sun deemed Fine and Mellow "the blues in all its raunchy glory." The Chicago Tribune opined that "her singing has plenty of snarl and bite, and she shrewdly has surrounded herself with a terrific lineup of instrumentalists."

Stereo Review considered it the best album of Brown's return to recording, likening it to "taking a stroll down memory lane and on into the kind of crowded, smoke-filled club where countless organ-and-vocal combos delighted weekend crowds." The Philadelphia Inquirer called it "another big, brash affair that showcases Brown as earthmother/vamp, a singer who ... can deliver lyrics with a wink and a sneer." The North County Times labeled it a "mini-history of Black American music."

AllMusic called the album a "nice contemporary effort with a strongly swinging R&B flavor running throughout."

== Track listing ==
No.	Title	Length
1.	"Fine and Mellow"
2.	"I Ain't Got Nothin' but the Blues"
3.	"A World I Never Made"
4.	"Salty Papa Blues"
5.	"I'll Drown in My Own Tears"
6.	"Knock Me a Kiss"
7.	"It's Just a Matter of Time"
8.	"Don't Get Around Much Anymore"
9.	"Nothing Takes the Place of You"
10.	"I'll Be Satisfied"
