= The Genius of Ray Charles =

Studio album by Ray Charles
- Released: October 1959
- Recorded: May 6 and June 23, 1959, at 6 West Recording, New York City
- Genres: Swingin' pop; traditional pop; rhythm and blues
- Length: 37:58
- Label: Atlantic
- Producers: Nesuhi Ertegün, Jerry Wexler

Ray Charles chronology
What'd I Say (1959)	The Genius of Ray Charles (1959)	Ray Charles in Person (1960)

Singles from The Genius of Ray Charles
- 1. "Let the Good Times Roll" Released: 1960; 2. "Don't Let the Sun Catch You Cryin'" Released: 1960; 3. "Just for a Thrill" Released: 1960; 4. "Come Rain or Come Shine / Tell Me You'll Wait for Me" Released: 1960; 5. "Am I Blue" Released: 1961

The Genius of Ray Charles is the sixth studio album by Ray Charles, released in October 1959 by Atlantic Records. The album consists of swinging pop with big band arrangements. It comprises a first half of big band songs and a second half of string-backed ballads. The Genius of Ray Charles sold fewer than 500,000 copies and charted at number 17 on the Billboard 200. "Let the Good Times Roll" and "Don't Let the Sun Catch You Cryin'" were released as singles in 1959.

== Composition ==
Genius marked the first time he worked within the setting of a traditional pop singer - he cut six songs with a studio big band and six with a string orchestra - and it was also his first full-length foray into the standards songbook.

— Will Friedwald

The album showcased Charles' breakout from rhythm and blues and onto a broader musical stage. Atlantic Records gave him full support in production and arrangements. As originally presented, the A side of the album featured the Ray Charles band with David "Fathead" Newman supplemented by players from the Count Basie and Duke Ellington bands, and arrangements by Quincy Jones.

The B side of the original album consists of six ballads with arrangements by Ralph Burns and a large string orchestra. Charles's performance of "Come Rain or Come Shine", a song identified with Frank Sinatra, brought public attention to his voice alone without the "distractions" of his soulful piano and his snappy band.

Each side contains a tribute to Louis Jordan with two songs he had hits with "Let the Good Times Roll" and "Don't Let the Sun Catch You Cryin'".

== Critical reception ==
Professional ratings
Review scores
Source	Rating
AllMusic	4.5/5 stars
The Encyclopedia of Popular Music	5/5 stars
The Penguin Guide to Blues Recordings	3/4 stars
The Rolling Stone Album Guide	4.5/5 stars

In a contemporary review, Joe Goldberg of the American Record Guide panned the arrangements as "hopelessly banal and inadequate, saved only" by the piano playing of Charles, who "comes through beautifully", and felt that only the last three songs give the album "its importance". He called "Am I Blue?" the album's highlight and "almost unbearably poignant, with the same feeling of deep sensibility transcending limited vocal equipment that can be heard on Walter Huston's recording of 'September Song', or Adolph Green's of 'A Quiet Girl'".

In a retrospective review for AllMusic, music critic Scott Yanow wrote that "Charles' voice is heard throughout in peak form, giving soul to even the veteran standards." In a 1990 review of its CD reissue, Lloyd Sachs of the Chicago Sun-Times wrote that The Genius of Ray Charles is "one of the all-time great albums. But it is not, alas, one of all the all-time great CDs. The sound is extremely harsh, exaggerating the partially hidden flaws of the original ... Still, the glory of Charles' singing and the ace arrangements ... have a way of breaking down resistance." In 2000, Q magazine included The Genius of Ray Charles in their list of the Best Soul Albums of All Time and wrote that it "finds the great man swinging, emoting, cajoling and laughing his way through a selection of standards that he makes his own ... it exudes pure class."

It was voted number 390 in Colin Larkin's All Time Top 1000 Albums 3rd Edition (2000). In 2003, Rolling Stone ranked The Genius of Ray Charles number 263 on their list of the 500 Greatest Albums of All Time, and 265 in a 2012 revised list. In a 2004 review for the magazine, Robert Christgau praised producers Jerry Wexler and Nesuhi Ertegun for persuading "five different arrangers into the subtlest charts of Charles' career". Christgau asserted that "Charles tried many times, but except for Modern Sounds, he never again assembled such a consistent album in this mode." In The Rolling Stone Album Guide (2004), critics J. D. Considine and Michaelangelo Matos said that it is "perhaps the most important of [Charles'] albums for Atlantic", because it "introduces the musical approach he would follow for much of the '70s". They argued that, instead of pursuing the contemporary sounds of Frank Sinatra, Dean Martin, or swing era big bands, Charles played a "curious hybrid of the brassy R&B of his pop-oriented recordings and the showy shmaltz favored by the era's middle-of-the-road acts". However, they cautioned listeners that the album was "abysmally recorded, with frequent overmodulation muddying its brasher moments."

== Track listing ==
Side one
No.	Title	Writer(s)	Length
1.	"Let the Good Times Roll"	Sam Theard, Fleecie Moore	2:53
2.	"It Had to Be You"	Gus Kahn, Isham Jones	2:45
3.	"Alexander's Ragtime Band"	Irving Berlin	2:53
4.	"Two Years of Torture"	Percy Mayfield, Charles Joseph Morris	3:25
5.	"When Your Lover Has Gone"	Einar Aaron Swan	2:51
6.	"'Deed I Do"	Walter Hirsch, Fred Rose	2:27
Total length:			17:14

Side two
No.	Title	Writer(s)	Length
1.	"Just for a Thrill"	Lil Hardin Armstrong, Don Raye	3:26
2.	"You Won't Let Me Go"	Bud Allen, Buddy Johnson	3:22
3.	"Tell Me You'll Wait for Me"	Charles Brown, Oscar Moore	3:25
4.	"Don't Let the Sun Catch You Cryin'"	Joe Greene	3:46
5.	"Am I Blue"	Grant Clarke, Harry Akst	3:41
6.	"Come Rain or Come Shine"	Johnny Mercer, Harold Arlen	3:42
Total length:			21:22

== Personnel ==
Side one

- Ray Charles - vocals, piano
- Clark Terry - trumpet
- Ernie Royal - trumpet
- Joe Newman - trumpet
- Snooky Young - trumpet
- Marcus Belgrave - trumpet
- John Hunt - trumpet
- Melba Liston - trombone
- Quentin Jackson - trombone
- Thomas Mitchell - trombone
- Al Grey - trombone
- Frank Wess - flute, alto saxophone and tenor saxophone
- Marshal Royal - alto saxophone
- Paul Gonsalves - tenor saxophone (and solo on "Two Years of Torture")
- Zoot Sims - tenor saxophone (on "Let the Good Times Roll", "Alexander's Ragtime Band" and "'Deed I Do")
- Billy Mitchell - tenor saxophone (on "It had to be You", "Two Years of Torture" and "When Your Lover Has Gone")
- David "Fathead" Newman - tenor saxophone (and solos on "Let the Good Times Roll", "When Your Lover Has Gone", "'Deed I Do")
- Quincy Jones – arranger, conductor on A1 and A6
- Ernie Wilkins - arrangement on A2
- Ralph Burns - arrangements on A3 and side 2
- Johnny Acea - arrangement on A4
- Al Cohn - arrangement on A5

Side two

- Ray Charles - piano and vocals
- Allen Hanlon - guitar
- Wendell Marshall - string bass
- Ted Sommer - drums
- Bob Brookmeyer - valve trombone
- Harry Lookofsky - concertmaster
  - Unidentified - large woodwinds and strings section
- Ralph Burns - arranger

Other credits

- Nat Hentoff - sleeve notes
- Bill Schwartau, Tom Dowd - recording engineer
- Marvin Israel - cover design
- Lee Friedlander - cover photography

== Bibliography ==
- Considine, J. D.; Matos, Michaelangelo; et al. (2004). Brackett, Nathan; Hoard, Christian (eds.). The New Rolling Stone Album Guide (4th ed.). Simon & Schuster. ISBN 0-7432-0169-8.
- Larkin, Colin (2006). Encyclopedia of Popular Music. Vol. 9 (4th ed.). Muze. ISBN 0195313739.
