= Reconversion Blues =

Single by Louis Jordan and his Tympany Five
- Released: 1946
- Genre: Jump blues, boogie woogie
- Label: Decca
- Songwriter(s): Steve Graham, Fleecie Moore

"Reconversion Blues" is a song attributed to Steve Graham and Fleecie Moore. It was performed by Louis Jordan and his Tympany Five, recorded in October 1946, and released on the Decca label (catalog no. 18762-A). The record's "B" side was "Salt Pork, West Virginia".

The song peaked at No. 2 on Billboard's race record chart and was ranked No. 14 on the magazine's year-end list of the most played race records of 1946.

Recorded two months after the end of World War II, the lyrics refer to the post-war freedom to buy goods that weren't strictly rationed or unavailable during the World War II. It reviews many of the newly available items, such as a new automobile, two-tone shoes, bacon, butter, cigarettes, nuts and bolts and screws, nylons for his baby, and most anything he chooses at the gas station. Jordan earlier had a No. 1 hit with his 1943 song "Ration Blues".

Jordan biographer Stephen Koch noted that the granting of partial songwriting credit to Jordan's wife, Fleecie Moore, was part of "a publishing and tax dodge gone awry."

== See also ==
- Billboard Most-Played Race Records of 1946
