= Fine and Mellow (disambiguation) =

"Fine and Mellow" is a jazz standard written by Billie Holiday.

Fine and Mellow may also refer to:

- Fine and Mellow (Ella Fitzgerald album), 1979
- Fine and Mellow (Etta Jones album), 1986
- Fine and Mellow (Ruth Brown album), 1991
- Fine and Mellow: Live at Birdland West, a 1988 album by Carmen McRae
