= Mabel Robinson Simms =

American jazz musician

Mable Robinson Simms, (born March 29, 1914, Cape Charles, Virginia, died January 27, 2005, Boston, Massachusetts) was an American jazz pianist and singer, she performed with notable jazz musicians, also as Mabel Robinson, in the 1940–950s, including Louis Jordan, Sammy Price, Skeets Tolbert, Sammy Davis Sr., Roy Haynes, Pearl Bailey, The 4 Blackamours, and released another album on her own. She was born in Cape Charles, Virginia, raised in Norfolk and with her family, moved to Boston in 1931. Her voice was signatory for being remarkably capable in both the jazz and blues arenas and she was a talented pianist. This would land her guest singing roles with Sammy Price, Louis Jordan and Skeets Tolbert.

== Career ==
She began working at Johnny Wilson's Swanee Grill on Tremont Street, Boston, in 1939 where renown jazz drummer Roy Haynes would see her when he was in high school. Of her Haynes said, "Mabel was this beautiful person. She sang with a tremolo in her voice." Simms worked with Haynes when he was just 16 at the Paradise Grill in Bowdoin Square, the owner was on the lookout for cops because Haynes was underage to perform past ten at night. Simms went to New York in the early forties and was connected with Sammy Davis Sr. at the Little Dixie club, Davis helped her get her first regular gig at Bud Harris' club in Harlem in 1944. After that brief stint in New York Simms began working at the very popular jazz spot, The Pioneer Club in Boston she led the house trio playing piano until 1955, she played all around clubs in the Boston area and had thriving career. After that she performed with her sister Frances Brown and Bill Tanner as The Four Rhythm Aces before a ten-year stint with the Moulin Rouge at the Hotel Vendome which burned in a tragic incident in 1972. She was a member of the New England Jazz Alliance where she was given special recognition in 2004.

Simms joined the local Boston Musicians Union in the early 1940s and remained active in it until her death, of that experience she said: "It did give me the advantage of earning a decent wage. And as the scale went up, my wages went up. That made a difference in my life. Some jobs didn't pay what I wanted, but they paid the scale, and then later on I got above scale. Oh, the days are different now, as you know. It really made a difference in my life."

This from the Boston Globe Obituary, "At the old Pioneer Club, a renowned after-hours spot in an alley off Tremont Street, jazz pianist and vocalist Mabel Robinson Simms drew in the fans with her bluesy piano and sultry voice in the 1950s. In those days, Boston was a mecca for jazz. When the other clubs closed for the night, big-name musicians gravitated to the Pioneer to jam with her. Dizzie Gillespie, Erroll Garner, Red Garland, Sarah Vaughn, and Carmen McRae were among them. Billie Holiday once sang "No Detour Ahead" there with Mrs. Simms's accompaniment."
