= R. M. Blues =

Single by Roy Milton and His Solid Senders
- Released: 1946
- Genre: Blues
- Label: Juke Box, Specialty

"R. M. Blues" is a blues song written by Roy Milton and performed by Roy Milton and His Solid Senders. It was released on the Juke Box label and Specialty labels, as well as Milton's own Roy Milton Record Co. Milton played drums and sang on the record.

The song peaked at No. 2 on Billboard's race record chart and remained on that chart for 25 weeks. It ranked No. 5 on the magazine's year-end list of the most played race records of 1946. The song was kept from the No. 1 spot by Lionel Hampton's "Hey! Ba-Ba-Re-Bop". The success of "R. M. Blues" was credited with making Specialty Records into a going concern.

== See also ==
- Billboard Most-Played Race Records of 1946
