= I've Got a Right to Cry =

Single by Joe Liggins & His Honeydrippers
- Released: 1946
- Length: 3:20
- Label: Exclusive
- Songwriter(s): Joe Liggins

"I've Got a Right to Cry" is a song written by Joe Liggins.

The song was originally recorded by Liggins and His Honeydrippers and released on the Exclusive label (catalog no. EXC-1014). Liggins played piano and sang vocals on the record.

It peaked at No. 2 on Billboard magazine's race records chart and spent 12 weeks on the chart. It ranked No. 16 on the magazine's year end list of the most played race records of 1946.

The song was also covered in 1946 by Erskine Hawkins and His Orchestra in a record released on the RCA Victor label (catalog no. 20-1902-B). Laura Washington sang the vocals on the Hawkins recording. The Hawkins version also peaked at No. 2 on the Billboard race records chart and was ranked No. 17 on the 1946 year-end list.

== See also ==
- Billboard Most-Played Race Records of 1946
