= Don't Worry 'Bout That Mule =

Single by Louis Jordan and his Tympany Five
- B-side: "Buzz Me"
- Released: December 1945
- Length: 2:10
- Label: Decca
- Songwriter(s): Charles Stewart, William Davis, Duke Groaner, Fleecie Moore

"Don't Worry 'Bout That Mule" is a song attributed to Charles Stewart, William Davis, Duke Groaner, and Fleecie Moore. It was performed by Louis Jordan and his Tympany Five, recorded in July 1945, and released on the Decca label (catalog no. 18734-A).

It peaked at No. 1 on Billboard's race record chart and remained on that chart for 11 weeks. It ranked No. 11 on the magazine's list of the most played race records of 1946.

Jordan and the Tympany Five also performed the song in two motion pictures: Beware (1946) and Swing Parade of 1946 (1946).

Jordan biographer Stephen Koch noted that the granting of partial songwriting credit to Jordan's wife, Fleecie Moore, was part of "a publishing and tax dodge gone awry."

== See also ==
- Billboard Most-Played Race Records of 1946
