= Salt Pork, West Virginia =

Single by Louis Jordan and his Tympany Five
- Released: 1946
- Label: Decca
- Songwriter(s): Fleecie Moore, William J. Tennyson Jr.

"Salt Pork, West Virginia" is a song attributed to Fleecie Moore and William J. Tennyson Jr., performed by Louis Jordan and his Tympany Five, and released on the Decca label (catalog no. 18762-B). It peaked at No. 2 on Billboard's race record chart and remained on the chart for 15 weeks. It ranked No. 8 on the magazine's list of the most played race records of 1946.

The song was recorded in July 1945 and released in 1946 as the "B" side to "Reconversion Blues" which was ranked at No. 14 on Billboard's list of the most played race records of 1946. Jordan biographer Stephen Koch noted that the granting of partial songwriting credit to Jordan's wife, Fleecie, was part of "a publishing and tax dodge gone awry." Jordan and the Tympany Five performed the song again in the 1946 motion picture, Beware.

The song marked the debut of electric guitarist, Carl Hogan, with Jordan's band. Jordan biographer John Chilton wrote that Hogan's playing added a new dimension to Jordan's band, "particularly apparent on 'Salt Pork, West Virginia' where his solo (with its modern signposts) and his flexible way of floating in and out of the ensemble created an appealing and highly musical effect." Chuck Berry later cited Hogan's work with Jordan as an inspiration for his trademark "Chuck Berry riff."

There is no city in West Virginia called "Salt Pork". The song arose out of an incident in which Jordan was cited for speeding while traveling to a performance in Bluefield, West Virginia. Jordan appeared in front of a local magistrate named Wallace W. "Squire" McNeal. Jordan promised the magistrate he would write a song about him.

Ramblin' Jack Elliott included the song as a regular part of his set list as a participant in Bob Dylan's Rolling Thunder Revue tour in 1975 and 1976.

== See also ==
- Billboard Most-Played Race Records of 1946
