= Five Guys Named Moe (song) =

Single by Louis Jordan and his Tympany Five
- Released: 1943
- Label: Decca
- Songwriters: Jerry Bresler, Larry Wynn

"Five Guys Named Moe" is a song written by Jerry Bresler and Larry Wynn, performed by Louis Jordan and his Tympany Five, recorded in January 1942, and released on the Decca label (catalog no. 8653). The song peaked at No. 3 on Billboard's race record chart and stayed on the chart for 10 weeks.

The song was covered by Joe Jackson on his 1981 album Joe Jackson's Jumpin' Jive.

A musical theatre production featuring the music of Louis Jordan was staged in London and New York in the early 1990s under the title Five Guys Named Moe.
