= Early in the Mornin' (Louis Jordan song) =

1947 song by Louis Jordan

Single by Louis Jordan & His Tympany Five
- A-side: "Look Out"
- Released: October 1947
- Recorded: New York City, April 23, 1947
- Genre: Blues
- Length: 3:20
- Label: Decca
- Songwriters: Dallas Bartley, Leo Hickman, Louis Jordan

Louis Jordan & His Tympany Five singles chronology
"Boogie Woogie Blue Plate" (1947)	"Early in the Mornin'" (1947)	"Barnyard Boogie" (1948)

"Early in the Mornin'" or "'Early in the Morning" is a song that was recorded by Louis Jordan and His Tympany Five in 1947. It is an early example of a blues which incorporates Afro-Cuban rhythms and percussive instruments. "Early in the Mornin'" became a hit, reaching number three in Billboard magazine's Race Records chart.

Jordan and his band later performed the song in the 1949 film Look Out Sister. It served as inspiration for James Brown and Chuck Berry. Various artists have recorded renditions of "Early in the Mornin'", often spelled as "Early in the Morning" (not to be confused with the earlier Sonny Boy Williamson I song "Early in the Morning").

== Original song ==
"Early in the Mornin'" has the structure of a twelve-bar blues with a strong rhythmic element. It is credited to Jordan, Tympany Five bassist Dallas Bartley, and Leo Hickman and has been variously described as a rumba, a samba, a calypso-influenced song, and a "Caribbean-flavoured number". As with many Jordan songs, it also has a comic element. The song begins with Latin-style percussion and Jordan calls out "Hey Pedro! ... Where is Lolito?" After a twelve-bar piano solo intro, Jordan's vocal begins:

It's early in the mornin' and I can't get right
Cause I had a date with my baby last night
Now it's early in the morning ...
And I ain't got nothin' but the blues

Backing Jordan on vocal and alto sax are Wild Bill Davis on piano, Bartley on bass, and Christopher Columbus on drums. Percussion is provided by band members Aaron Isenhall, Eddie Johnson, and Carl Hogan.

== Look Out Sister ==
Poster for the 1949 Louis Jordan film Look Out Sister

Louis Jordan recorded a second version of "Early in the Mornin'" in 1949 for Look Out Sister "a sixty-seven-minute picture that featured Louis as a musical cowboy". His performance of the song was filmed in front of a U.S. southwestern-style ranch house with the band dressed in 1940s Hollywood cowboy garb. In his autobiography, James Brown recalled seeing Jordan's films when he was young and was inspired by the showmanship of performances such as "Early in the Mornin'" and especially "Caldonia".
