= I Know (Andy Kirk song) =

Single by Andy Kirk and His Orchestra, The Jubalaires
- Released: 1946
- Label: Decca
- Songwriters: Ted Brooks, John Jennings

"I Know" is a song written by Ted Brooks and John Jennings, two members of the vocal group The Jubalaires. It was performed by Andy Kirk and His Orchestra and The Jubalaires. It was recorded in New York City on November 27, 1945, and released on the Decca label (catalog no. 18782-B). It was the "B" side to "Get Together with the Lord".

The song has been described as a "more secular and bluesy number" in the standard AABA form. Tenor Orville Brooks, who had recently left the Golden Gate Quartet, sang the lead vocal on the song.

In March 1946, "I Know" reached No. 2 on Billboard magazine's race records chart. It was also No. 9 on Billboard's year-end list of the most played race records of 1946.

== See also ==
- Billboard Most-Played Race Records of 1946
