= Don't Be a Baby, Baby =

Single by The Mills Brothers
- Released: 1946
- Length: 2:59
- Label: Decca
- Songwriters: Howard Steiner, Buddy Kaye

"Don't Be a Baby, Baby" is a song written by Howard Steiner and Buddy Kaye, performed by The Mills Brothers, and released on the Decca label (catalog no. 18753-A). It peaked at No. 3 on Billboard magazine's race records chart and spent eight weeks on that chart. It also reached No. 12 on the pop chart. It was ranked No. 15 on the Billboard's year-end list of the most played race records of 1946.

== See also ==
- Billboard Most-Played Race Records of 1946
