= What's the Use of Getting Sober (When You Gonna Get Drunk Again) =

Single by Louis Jordan and his Tympany Five
- B-side: "The Chicks I Pick Are Slender and Tender and Tall"
- Released: 1942
- Label: Decca
- Songwriter: Bubsy Meyers

"What's the Use of Getting Sober (When You Gonna Get Drunk Again)" is a song written by Bubsy Meyers, performed by Louis Jordan and his Tympany Five, recorded in July 1942, and released on the Decca label (catalog no. 8645). The "B" side of the record was "The Chicks I Pick Are Slender and Tender and Tall".

The record peaked at No. 1 on Billboard's race record chart and remained on the chart for 14 weeks. It was Jordan's first No. 1 record.

In a November 1942 review in The Billboard, M. H. Orodenker wrote: "The trumpet, with plenty of 'hicks' to his hot horn licks, establishes the mood right from the edge."

The song's lyrics are in the form of a dialogue between a father and his son. The father expresses concern that the son is drinking too much and is looking "thin as a twig." The son responds by describing his love of whiskey and gin and drinking all night. The son returns repeatedly to the song's refrain, "So what's the use of getting sober, When you're gonna get drunk again."

The song was included in the 1977 compilation, The Best of Louis Jordan. It was covered by Joe Jackson on his 1981 release Joe Jackson's Jumpin' Jive.
