= Stone Cold Dead in the Market (He Had It Coming) =

1939 song with lyrics and music by Wilmoth Houdini

"Stone Cold Dead in the Market (He Had It Coming)" is a 1939 song with lyrics and music by Wilmoth Houdini, a Trinidad and Tobago musician who had moved to the United States. Houdini's first version bore the title "He Had It Coming." It was recorded in 1946 by Ella Fitzgerald and Louis Jordan and His Tympany Five on Decca and later included in the Ella Fitzgerald album Ella and Her Fellas.

The lively tone of the music is matched by the use of dark humor in the lyrics. The song is sung in first-person and tells the story of an unnamed woman who killed her husband with a rolling pin, bashing in his skull while in a marketplace after he went out drinking and then came home and beat her. The narrative shifts back and forth between the wife who repeatedly claims that "he had it coming" and doesn't care about either revenge from his family or facing the electric chair, and the husband who recounts his side of the story apparently from beyond the grave. At the end of the song, the husband vows to come back and exact his revenge, but she repudiates by reminding him that he can't come back from the grave. Throughout the song, both the wife and the husband refrain that she didn't kill anyone else but the husband.

Franklin Bruno said in a piece in the journal Popular Music and Society: "Fitzgerald and Jordan's adoption of an exoticized West [Indian] accent, as well as their public personae, effectively produced a comic and ethnic 'mask' from behind which the song's subject matter could be presented with relative frankness."

== Chart performance ==
The single was the first of five that Louis Jordan would take to the number-one spot on the R&B Juke Box chart. The song also reached number seven on the U.S. pop chart. This, even though two radio networks -- NBC and ABC -- banned the song. The B-side of the single, "Petootie Pie", was also an R&B chart hit, peaking at number three.

== See also ==
- Billboard Most-Played Race Records of 1946
- List of Billboard number-one R&B singles of the 1940s
