= That Chick's Too Young to Fry =

Single by Louis Jordan and his Tympany Five
- Released: 1946
- Genre: Jump blues, boogie-woogie
- Label: Decca
- Songwriter(s): Tommy Edwards, Jimmy Hilliard

"That Chick's Too Young to Fry" is a song written by Tommy Edwards and Jimmy Hilliard. It was performed by Louis Jordan and his Tympany Five, recorded in January 1946, and released on the Decca label (catalog no. 23610-A). The record's "B" side was "Choo Choo Ch'Boogie".

The song peaked at No. 3 on Billboard's race record chart and remained on the chart for 11 weeks. It ranked No. 15 on the magazine's year-end list of the most played race records of 1946.

The song's lyrics are a double entendre in which the singer warns a young man not to dare "harm that bird" and tells him to release it because "that chick's too young to fry." He suggests that the man get away, stay away, and come back another day, and stop his crying, as there will come a time when "she'll be ready for fryin'."

Jordan and the Tympany Five also performed the song in the 1947 feature film Reet, Petite, and Gone.

== See also ==
- Billboard Most-Played Race Records of 1946
