= Don't Let the Sun Catch You Cryin' =

Song by Louis Jordan And His Tympany Five
- Released: 1946
- Genre: Blues
- Songwriter: Joe Greene

"Don't Let the Sun Catch You Cryin'" is a song written by Joe Greene and released in 1946 by Louis Jordan And His Tympany Five. Jordan's version reached No. 3 in Billboard's chart of "Most-Played Juke Box Race Records".

== Other recordings ==
- The song was recorded by Ray Charles and appeared in his 1959̇ album The Genius of Ray Charles. Charles' version reached No. 17 on Billboard's "Hot R&B Sides" and No. 95 on the Billboard Hot 100.
- Steve Alaimo released a version in 1963.
- It was also recorded by Jackie DeShannon on her 1965 album This Is Jackie DeShannon.
- Alto saxophonist Art Pepper recorded it on his 1982 duet album with pianist George Cables, Goin' Home.
- Dr. John recorded it on his 1989 album "In a Sentimental Mood".
- Paul McCartney on his 1990 live album Tripping the Live Fantastic.
- Jeff Buckley's 1993 recording of the song appears on his posthumously released compilation album You and I (2016)

== See also ==
- Billboard Most-Played Race Records of 1946
