= William J. Tennyson Jr. =

American jazz musician, songwriter (1923–1959)

William "Bill" J. Tennyson Jr. (1923–1959) was a notable American jazz musician.

== Career ==
A Louisiana Creole, Tennyson was born in New Orleans, Louisiana and his father was born in Donaldsonville, Louisiana. After his mother died when Tennyson was aged three, he and his two younger siblings moved to live with their grandmother, Mathilda, who had formerly owned a sugar cane plantation near the Bayous of Louisiana.

"Bill" was a major part of Jazz and the Harlem Renaissance period. He attended a university in Louisiana at age 13, was a self-taught musician and, aged 16, was one of the first of color to attend the world-renowned Juilliard School of Music. He was an ASCAP member from 1950.

During the latter part of his career, he partnered with Fay Tishman (Note: Fay Tishman (née Frances Fay Hartman; 1913–2006) was a member of ASCAP (see ASCAP Biographical Dictionary, 4th ed., 1980 – below, under "Inline citations")) to found what would have been one of the few black music publishing companies (Tishman went on to become president of ASCAP's New York branch).

In addition he wrote and composed for artists including Ella Fitzgerald, Sarah Vaughan, Johnny Mathis and The Orioles, Cab Calloway, and wrote and composed soundtracks for several Louis Jordan films, one of history’s first breaking black moviemakers.

== Selected compositions ==
1. "Bar Fly Blues"
  w & m Bill Tennyson Jr. (w&m)
  © Preview Music Co., Chicago
  26 May 1947; EU77215
2. "It Really Ain't Fair to Condemn a Square"
  William J. Tennyson Jr. (w&m)
  Huey Long (w&m)
  © William [J.] Tennyson Jr., New York, &
  Huey Long, Corona, N.Y.
  15 February 1947 EU63129
3. "New Orleans Makes Me Think of Beans"
  William J. Tennyson Jr. (w&m)
  Huey Long (w&m)
  © William [J.] Tennyson Jr., New York &
  Huey Long, Corona, N.Y.
  15 February 1947; EU63127
4. "On Sentimental Boulevard"
  William J. Tennyson Jr. (w&m)
  Huey Long (w&m)
  © William [J.] Tennyson Jr., New York &
  Huey Long, Corona, N.Y.
  15 February 1947; EU63130
5. "Watch Her or She'll Get You"
  William J. Tennyson Jr. (w&m)
  Huey Long (w&m)
  © William [J.] Tennyson Jr. New York &
  Huey Long, Corona, N.Y.
  15 February 1947; EU63128
6. "Oh! Gram'Pa"
  Cab Calloway (w&m)
  William Tennyson (w&m)
  Elton Hill (w&m)
  © Crescendo Music Corp.
  13 July 1947; EU85244

== Death ==
Tennyson died, aged 36, in a car crash in New York soon after completing a hit record Centerpiece with John Coltrane.
