= Knock Me a Kiss =

Single by Louis Jordan and his Tympany Five
- B-side: "I'm Gonna Move to the Outskirts of Town"
- Released: 1942
- Label: Decca
- Songwriter(s): Mike Jackson, Andy Razaf

"Knock Me a Kiss" is a song written by Mike Jackson (music) and Andy Razaf (lyrics). It was performed by Louis Jordan and his Tympany Five, recorded in November 1941, and released on the Decca label (catalog no. 8593). The B-side was "I'm Gonna Move to the Outskirts of Town".

The record was a hit, but was released prior to the creation of the Harlem Hit Parade chart in late October 1942. Despite the lack of precise chart information, music historians William and Nancy Young wrote: "The recording took off as an immediate hit; its ... slangy lyrics (or jive, to use the language of the time) ... proved irresistible to record buyers and made Jordan and his band a force in the marketplace."

The song was one of the twenty songs included in the 1977 MCA collection The Best of Louis Jordan and in many other Jordan compilations.

Ella Fitzgerald recorded this for her 1958 album Ella Swings Lightly on Verve Records.
