= Beware (Louis Jordan song) =

Single by Louis Jordan and his Tympany Five
- B-side: "Don't Let the Sun Catch You Crying"
- Released: April 10, 1946
- Genre: Jump blues
- Length: 2:53
- Label: Decca
- Songwriters: Morry Lasco, Dick Adams, Fleecie Moore

"Beware" is a song attributed to Morry Lasco, Dick Adams, and Fleecie Moore. It was performed by Louis Jordan and his Tympany Five, recorded in January 1946, and released on the Decca label (catalog no. 18818-A).

It peaked at No. 2 on Billboard's race record chart and remained on the chart for nine weeks. It also reached No. 20 on the pop chart. It was ranked No. 13 on the magazine's list of the most played race records of 1946.

Jordan and the Tympany Five also performed the song as the title track for the motion picture Beware (1946).

Jordan biographer Stephen Koch noted that the granting of partial songwriting credit to Jordan's wife, Fleecie Moore, was part of "a publishing and tax dodge gone awry."

== See also ==
- Billboard Most-Played Race Records of 1946
