= Buzz Me =

Jump blues song first recorded by Louis Jordan

Single by Louis Jordan and His Tympany Five
- Released: 1946
- Recorded: January 19, 1945
- Genre: Jump blues
- Length: 2:48
- Label: Decca
- Songwriter(s): Fleecie Moore, Danny Baxter a.k.a. Dave Dexter, Jr.

"Buzz Me" is a 1946 song by Louis Jordan and his Tympany Five that is credited to Fleecie Moore and Danny Baxter (a.k.a. Dave Dexter Jr.). Released by Decca Records as a single, it was the first song in 1946 to reach the number one spot on the R&B chart and was the first of five Louis Jordan releases to achieve the top position in 1946. "Buzz Me" also peaked at number nine on the pop chart. The single became a double-sided hit when the B-side "Don't Worry 'Bout That Mule" also hit number one on the R&B chart later in the year.

Later in 1946, Ella Mae Morse recorded her own version, which peaked at number two on the R&B charts and number fifteen on the pop chart.

== See also ==
- Billboard Most-Played Race Records of 1946
