= Saturday Night Fish Fry =

"Saturday Night Fish Fry (Part 1)"

Single by Louis Jordan & His Tympany Five
- B-side: "Saturday Night Fish Fry" (Concluded)
- Released: October 8 1949: January 7 1950 (re-release)
- Recorded: August 9, 1949
- Genre: Jump blues
- Length: 3:12 (Part 1); 2:48 (Part 2/concluded); 5:21 (full version)
- Label: Decca
- Songwriters: Louis Jordan, Ellis Walsh

Louis Jordan & His Tympany Five singles chronology
"Beans and Corn Bread" (1949)	"Saturday Night Fish Fry (Part 1)" (1949)	"School Days" (1950)

"Saturday Night Fish Fry" is a jump blues song written by Louis Jordan and Ellis Lawrence Walsh, best known through the version recorded by Louis Jordan and His Tympany Five. The recording is considered to be one of the "excellent and commercially successful" examples of the jump blues genre.

While the origins of rock and roll are disputed, some have also suggested that the song may be the first rock 'n' roll record. The song contains elements later common in rock 'n' roll such as electric guitar, a brisk tempo and "a mix of the bass," and the singer begins each chorus with the catchphrase, "It was rockin'," repeating it several times.

== National hit ==
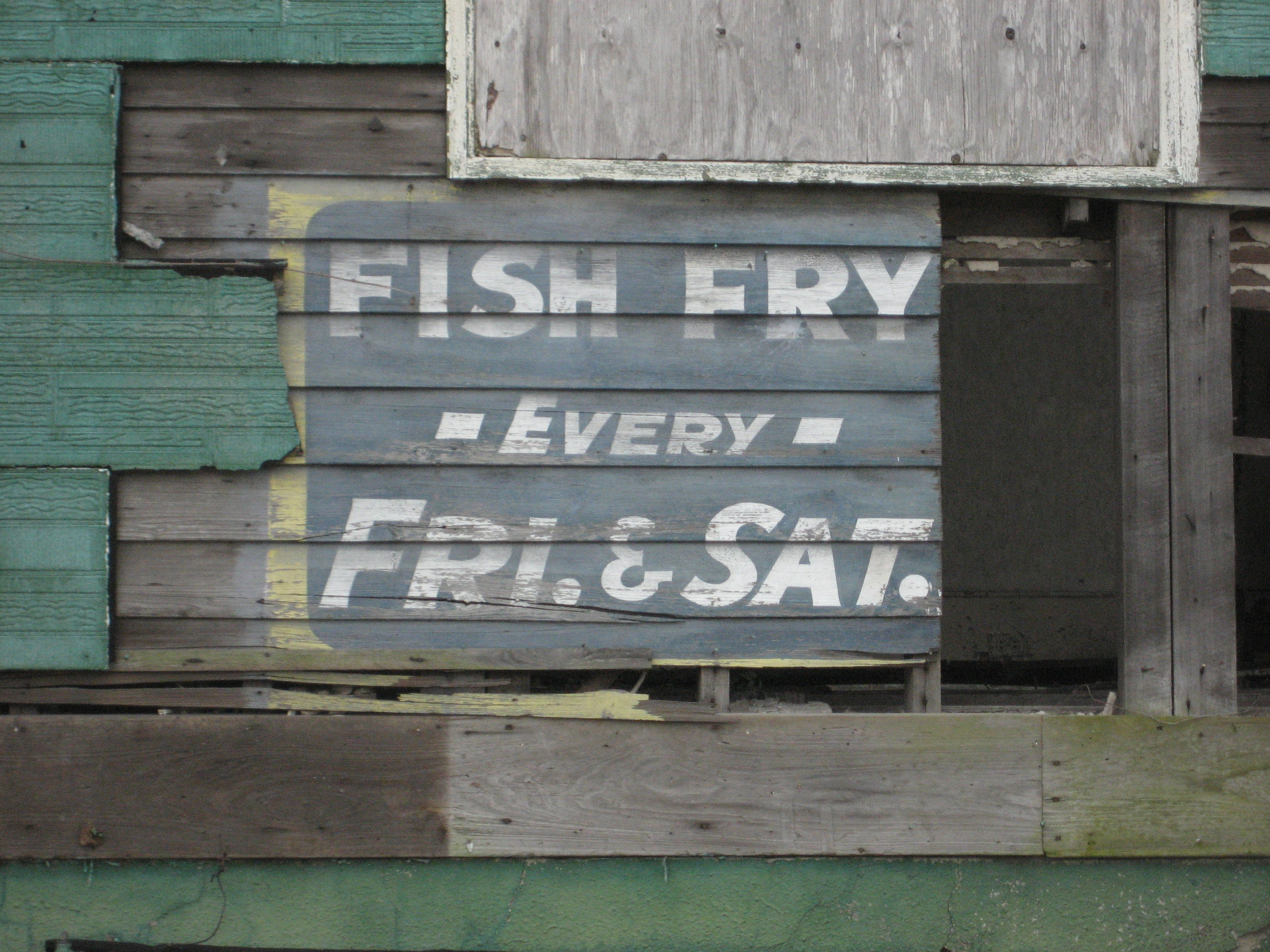
Old fish fry sign, New Orleans

The single was a big hit, topping the R&B chart for twelve non-consecutive weeks in late 1949. It also reached number 21 on the national popular music chart, an unusual accomplishment for a "race record" at that time (although Jordan had already had many "crossover" hits). Jordan's jump blues combo was one of the most successful acts of its time, and its loose and streamlined style of play was highly influential.

== First recordings ==
"Saturday Night Fish Fry" was first recorded by Eddie Williams and his Brown Buddies, with spoken vocals by the song's composer, Ellis Walsh. Williams had a number two R&B hit with the song "Broken Hearted". "Saturday Night Fish Fry" was intended to be the band's next single, but the acetate found its way to Louis Jordan's agent instead. As Williams recalled, "They got theirs out there first."

Jordan changed the song. One source provides this summary: he took "the song’s ‘hook’ and [sang] it twice after every other verse. The arrangement was also more propulsive, too; Williams’ shuffle was replaced by a raucous, rowdy jump Boogie-woogie". The expression "it was rockin'" appears four times in the chorus, which is sung seven times. His version was produced by Milt Gabler.

At 5:21, the recording ran longer than a standard side of a 78 record, so it was broken into two halves, one on each side of the disc. The song's lyrics are in the first person and describe two itinerant musicians going to a fish fry on Rampart Street in New Orleans, Louisiana. The party turns wild and is raided by the police; the narrator subsequently spends the night in jail.

== Composition ==
Jordan's "Saturday Night Fish Fry" has been called an example of jump blues because "it literally made its listeners jump to its pulsing beat", according to NPR, which points out the use of the word "rockin'" in the chorus. The Acoustic Music organization states that the recording marked "the end of the jump blues dominance of the '40s".

One reviewer offered this comment in 2016 on the Jordan version: "Jordan’s pithy, witty vocal style, bumping jump-blues rhythms, and taste for lyrics that both wag their tongue and bite are as plainly irresistible as pop music gets".

Some sources also consider it as a precursor to rock and roll, or perhaps, one of the first rock and roll records. The Rock and Roll Hall of Fame stated that the recording was "an early example of rap and possibly the first rock and roll recording". Another source went a step further in 2013 with this comment: "Jordan’s rapid-fire, talky delivery presaged another musical style that in 1950 was barely on the horizon—rap".

The song had a "lively jump rhythm, call-and response chorus and double-string electric guitar riffs that Chuck Berry would later admit to copying", according to one source. In fact, Chuck Berry was quoted as saying, "To my recollection, Louis Jordan was the first [person] that I heard play rock and roll."

The guitar work, brisk tempo, "and emphasis in the recording mix of punctuating each beat" certainly influenced later artists and the recording's style went on to "characterize 1950s rock and roll". Jordan re-recorded the song in 1973 for an album titled I Believe in Music.
