= Casey Bill Weldon =

American country blues musician

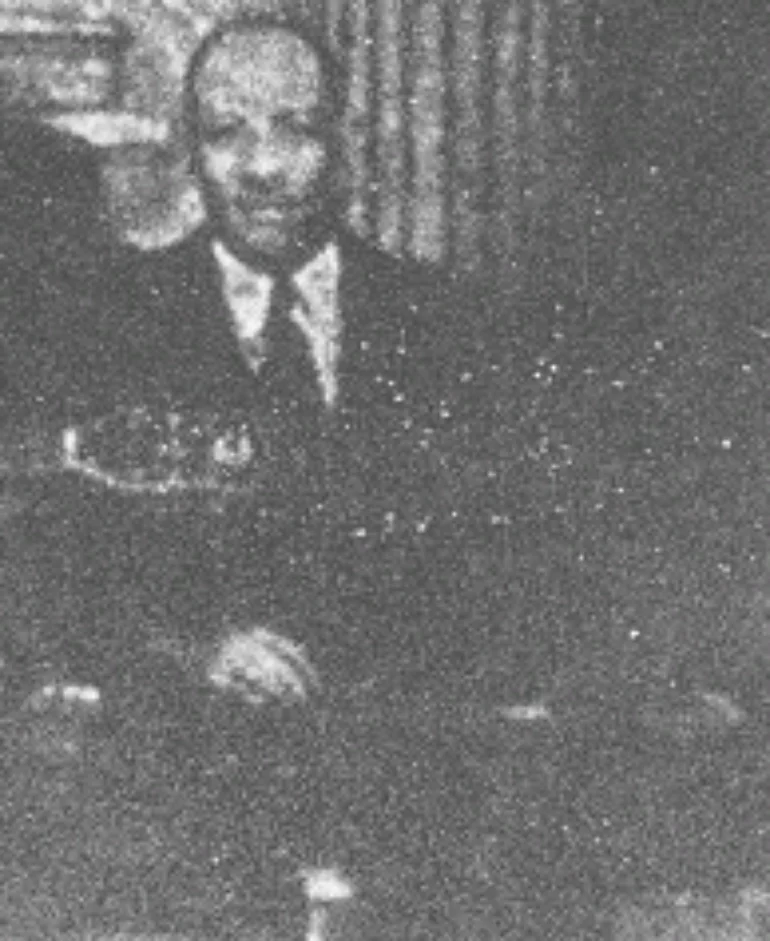
- The only known photograph of Weldon

Background information
- Born: William Weldon; February 2, 1901, or December 10, 1909; Pine Bluff, Arkansas, U.S.
- Died: September 28, 1972 (aged 62 or 71) Kansas City, Missouri
- Genres: Country blues
- Occupations: Musician, singer
- Instruments: Vocals, slide guitar
- Years active: Presumably 1927 – c. 1940
- Labels: Vocalion, Bluebird

William "Casey Bill" Weldon (February 2, 1901, or December 10, 1909 – September 28, 1972) was an American country blues musician.

Some details of Weldon's life are unconfirmed. According to some sources, he was born in Pine Bluff, Arkansas, and later lived and worked in Chicago. He reportedly made his way to Chicago via Kansas City, which gave rise to his nickname, a version of K.C. He was one of the early musicians who recorded playing slide guitar. He played upbeat, hokum and country blues tunes. Playing a National steel guitar flat on his lap Hawaiian style, he was known as the "Hawaiian Guitar Wizard".

According to some sources, Weldon was married to the singer and guitarist Memphis Minnie in the 1920s, but this is now believed to be a misidentification. Only recently it has been widely accepted that he is not the musician, Will Weldon, who recorded between 1927 and 1928 as a member of the Memphis Jug Band.

Weldon cut over 60 sides for Bluebird and Vocalion. He was also an active session guitarist, performing on records by Teddy Darby, Bumble Bee Slim, Peetie Wheatstraw, and Memphis Minnie. On Memphis Minnie's last recording for Bluebird Records, in October 1935, Weldon accompanied her for the first time. He played on two sides, "When the Sun Goes Down, Part 2" and "Hustlin' Woman Blues". He had solo hits with his two best-known songs, "Somebody Done Changed the Lock on That Door" and "We Gonna Move to the Outskirts of Town".

According to some sources, after his divorce from Memphis Minnie, he married the blues singer Geeshie Wiley. They disappeared from the public eye soon after, and he had stopped recording by 1938. He is believed to be the William Weldon who died in Kansas City in 1972.

In 2014 the Killer Blues Headstone Project placed a headstone for him at Lincoln Cemetery in Blue Summit, Missouri.
