= We Gonna Move to the Outskirts of Town =

Blues song adapted and performed by many

"We Gonna Move to the Outskirts of Town" is a song originally recorded on September 3, 1936, by Piedmont blues musician Casey Bill Weldon. Weldon performed it as a solo piece, with vocals and acoustic guitar plus piano and double bass accompaniment.

The song has been adapted and recorded by many other musicians, most often under the title "I'm Gonna Move to the Outskirts of Town", and sometimes simply "Outskirts of Town". In 1941, Louis Jordan and His Tympany Five recorded "I'm Gonna Move to the Outskirts of Town" (Decca 8593), and the following year recorded another version as "I'm Gonna Leave You on the Outskirts of Town", with the writing credit given to Roy Jacobs and Casey Bill Weldon (Decca 8638). This second recording became the first of Jordan's many R&B chart hits, reaching No.3 on Billboard's newly established "Harlem Hit Parade" chart in October 1942.

== Critical reception ==
The lyrics of this song have been criticised by feminist analysis; some have called for the track to be pulled from contemporary play lists such as TSF Jazz in France.

The critique focuses on the framing of the orator’s wife as behaving wantonly with various male visitors to the home. The song writer’s response, as captured by the track’s very title, is to move the wife “way on the outskirts of town”, away from male visitors. This, it is argued, advocates for and legitimises a traditional and deeply patriarchal control of female sexuality, further embedded in the treatment of a wife as a possession that can be moved along with the home, seemingly without consultation.

== Other recordings ==
- 1942 – Count Basie and His Orchestra, Columbia 36601
- 1942 – Big Bill and his Chicago Five, Columbia 37196
- 1942 – Jimmie Lunceford and His Orchestra, Decca 18324
- 1954 – Jackie Wilson, as lead singer of Billy Ward and his Dominoes, Federal 12178
- 1955 – Jack Montrose, on the album Arranged/Played/Composed by Jack Montrose
- 1960 – Mel Tormé, on the album I Dig the Duke! I Dig the Count!
- 1961 – Ray Charles, ABC-Paramount Records single which reached No. 84 on the Billboard Hot 100; appears in the end credits of the 2006 "Johnny Cakes" episode of U.S. TV series The Sopranos
- 1961 – The Everly Brothers, single, included on the 1965 album Rock'n Soul
- 1962 – Lou Rawls, on the album Stormy Monday
- 1964 – Rod Stewart, B-side of his Decca single "Good Morning Little Schoolgirl"
- 1965 -- Little Milton, on the album We're Gonna Make It
- 1965 – B. B. King, on the album Confessin' the Blues
- 1967 – Jimmy Witherspoon, on the album The Blues Is Now
- 1968 – Albert King, on the live album Thursday Night in San Francisco
- 1968 – The Big Band Sound of Thad Jones/Mel Lewis featuring Miss Ruth Brown
- 1970 – The Allman Brothers Band, live recording, included on Fillmore East, February 1970; a rare rehearsal recording included on Brothers and Sisters (Deluxe edition), a live recording from Ludlow Garage 1970 included on Idlewild South (Deluxe edition)
- 1972 – Muddy Waters, on the album The London Muddy Waters Sessions
- 1977 – Jim Jarvis on the album “Outskirts of Town”
- 1979 – Buddy Guy, on the album The Blues Giant, later released as Stone Crazy!
- 1983 – Albert King and Stevie Ray Vaughan, on the live album In Session
- 1999 – B. B. King, on the album Let the Good Times Roll
- 2000 – Willie Nelson and Keb' Mo', on the album Milk Cow Blues
- 2008 – David Sanborn, on the album Here and Gone
