= Is You Is or Is You Ain't My Baby =

Song written and performed by Louis Jordan

Single by Louis Jordan & His Tympany Five
- A-side: "G.I. Jive"
- Released: June 1944
- Recorded: October 4, 1943
- Genre: Rhythm and blues, jazz
- Label: Decca 8659
- Songwriters: Billy Austin, Louis Jordan

"Is You Is or Is You Ain't My Baby" is a song written by Louis Jordan and Billy Austin. The song's first recording, by Jordan, was made on October 4, 1943. It was released as the B-side of a single with "G.I. Jive" with the title "Is You Is or Is You Ain't (Ma' Baby)". The song reached No. 1 on the US folk/country charts, number two for three weeks on the pop chart, and number three on the R&B chart.

The standard has been recorded by more than 130 different artists over the years.

== Musical style ==
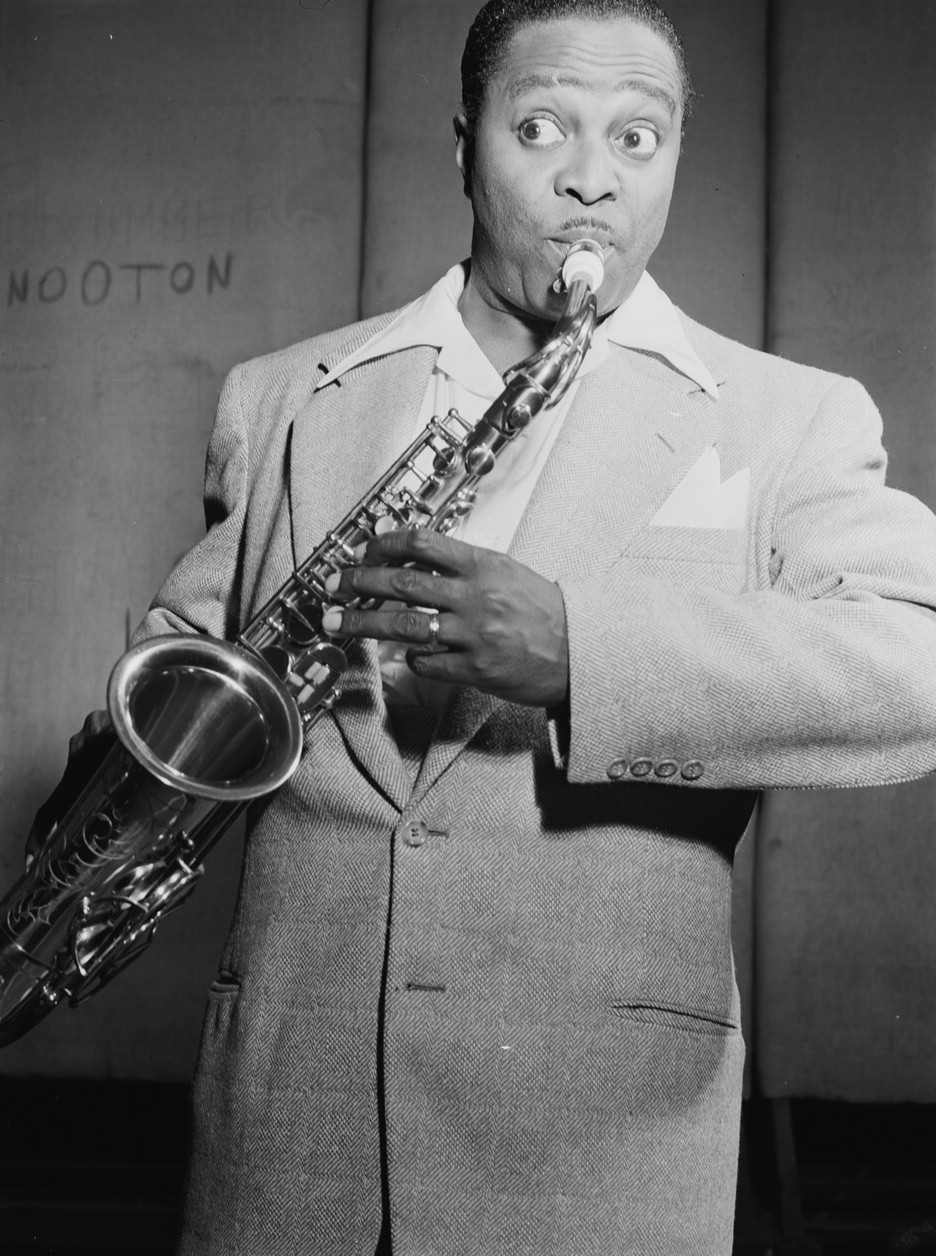
Jordan in New York, July 1946

One publication of the Smithsonian Institution provided this summary of Jordan's music.

One important stylistic prototype in the development of R&B was jump blues, pioneered by Louis Jordan, with ... His Tympany Five ... three horns and a rhythm section, while stylistically his music melded elements of swing and blues, incorporating the shuffle rhythm, boogie-woogie bass lines, and short horn patterns or riffs. The songs featured the use of African American vernacular language, humor, and vocal call-and-response sections between Jordan and the band. Jordan's music appealed to both African American and white audiences, and he had broad success with hit songs like "Is You Is or Is You Ain’t My Baby" (1944).

== Covers ==
In the 1932 American film Harlem Is Heaven, dancer Bill "Bojangles" Robinson, accompanied by jazz pianist Putney Dandridge, sings "Is You Is or Is You Ain't." The song in the film has different lyrics, but, in addition to its title, its melody is at times similar to that later used for "Is You Is or Is You Ain't My Baby."

Bing Crosby and The Andrews Sisters recorded the song on June 30, 1944, for Decca Records and it too reached the No. 2 spot in the Billboard charts during a 12-week stay.

In the 1945 Warner Bros. cartoon "The Unruly Hare", Bugs Bunny tricks Elmer Fudd into kissing him at which point Bugs asks Elmer, "Is you is or is you ain't my baby"?

The song was also featured in the 1946 Tom and Jerry short "Solid Serenade", in which Tom sings it to his lover. Tom's singing voice is provided by Ira "Buck" Woods.

B. B. King and Dr. John covered it on Let the Good Times Roll, King's Louis Jordan tribute album; the song won the 2001 Grammy Award for Best Pop Collaboration with Vocals.

The song is heard repeatedly throughout the 2023 supernatural thriller Brooklyn 45, playing from a Zenith floor radio.
