= Jerry Bresler =

Jerome (Jerry) Bresler (May 29, 1914 in Chicago, Illinois – March 17, 2000 in Delray Beach, Florida) was an American conductor, songwriter and musician. He played piano at the age of 2 and conducted the NYU orchestra at 14. One of his most famous musical compositions was Five Guys Named Moe.

He was educated at Theodore Roosevelt High School (Chicago) (where in 1931 he wrote the school song "Go Rough Riders Go"), Chicago Musical College and DePaul University, where he studied music theory, composition, conducting and orchestration with Dr. Samuel Lieberson, and at NYU with Schillinger method professor Rudolf Schramm.

In 1950, he joined ASCAP and started producing shows for various nightclub acts like Robert Goulet, Sophie Tucker and Arlene Dahl. In 1956, he formed a partnership with Lyn Duddy writing and producing TV and nightclub acts including Jaye P. Morgan, Ford Specials, Merv Griffin Show, Jackie Gleason Show and the Honeymooners. He also collaborated with Larry Wynn writing songs.

He had a twin sister named Geraldine.
