= Ration Blues =

Single by Louis Jordan and his Tympany Five
- B-side: "Deacon Jones"
- Released: December 1943
- Recorded: October 1943
- Genre: Jump blues
- Length: 3:04
- Label: Decca
- Songwriter(s): Louis Jordan, Antonio Cosey, Collenane Clark

"Ration Blues" is a song written by Louis Jordan, Antonio Cosey, and Collenane Clark. It was performed by Louis Jordan and his Tympany Five, recorded in October 1943, and released on the Decca label (catalog no. 8654). The "B" side of the record was "Deacon Jones".

== Lyrics ==
The song's lyrics describe the inconveniences resulting from the U.S. government's wartime rationing of sugar, meat, jelly, rubber, gasoline, and other consumer products. It opens with the line: "Baby baby baby, what's wrong with Uncle Sam? He's cut down on my sugar, now he's messin' with my ham."

== Reception ==
The record found a public that related to the hardships imposed by rationing and jumped by February 1944 to No. 1 on both the country and R&B charts and No. 11 on the pop chart. On the Harlem Hit Parade, the song debuted on December 18, 1943, peaked at No. 1 on the Harlem Hit Parade, and remained on the chart for 21 weeks.

== Short film ==
The song was also performed by Louis and the Tympany Five in a short film titled Ration Blues (1944).
