= Walter Bishop Sr. =

Jamaican-American drummer, composer and songwriter (1905–1984)

Walter Bishop Sr. (January 9, 1905 – January 8, 1984) was a Jamaican-American drummer, composer and songwriter. Bishop was born in Jamaica, but emigrated to the United States prior to beginning his professional career. He and his family lived in the Sugar Hill district of the Harlem neighborhood of Upper Manhattan.

Bishop played drums on recordings by pianist Alex Hill and trumpeter Jabbo Smith during the 1920s and 1930s. His song "Swing, Brother, Swing" was recorded by Billie Holiday with Count Basie, among other performers. Other songs written by Bishop include "Jack, You're Dead," which was a #1 R&B hit in 1947 as recorded by Louis Jordan, "The Stuff is Here (and It's Mellow)," and "Bop! Goes My Heart," which was recorded by Frank Sinatra. His song "My Baby Likes to Bebop" was recorded by Ella Fitzgerald, and by Nat "King" Cole with Johnny Mercer, and his calypso "Sex is a Misdemeanor" was recorded by Vanessa Rubin.

He was the father of American jazz pianist Walter Bishop Jr.
