= Caldonia =

Jump blues standard

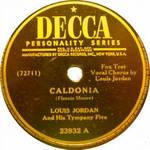

Single by Louis Jordan and His Tympany Five
- B-side: "Somebody Done Changed the Lock on My Door"
- Released: 1945
- Recorded: January 19, 1945
- Genre: Jump blues
- Length: 2:40
- Label: Decca
- Songwriter: Fleecie Moore (credited)
- Producer: Milt Gabler

"Caldonia" is a jump blues song, first recorded in 1945 by Louis Jordan and his Tympany Five. Although credited to Fleecie Moore, his wife at the time, Jordan is the actual songwriter. The song was a hit for Jordan as well as several other musicians.

== Louis Jordan recording ==
"It's rooted in jazz," writes music journalist John Morrison, "The energy is very much rock and roll. And you can even hear the future of what would become rap music and hip-hop along with the beat of rock and roll." The lyrics include Jordan's trademark use of comedy:

Walkin' with my baby she's got great big feet
She's long, lean, and lanky and ain't had nothing to eat
She's my baby and I love her just the same
Crazy 'bout that woman 'cause Caldonia is her name

The verses conclude with the refrain:

Caldonia! Caldonia!
What makes your big head so hard?
I love her, I love her just the same
Crazy 'bout that woman 'cause Caldonia is her name

In 1942, Jordan began an unparalleled successful run on the Billboard Harlem Hit Parade (forerunner of the R&B chart). By 1945, Jordan had four number-one hits and eventually became the most successful R&B chart act of the 1940s. "Caldonia" became his fifth number one on "Race Records" chart. It debuted on the chart in May 1945 and reached number one in June, where it stayed for seven weeks; on Billboard's broader chart, the song peaked at number six.

Jordan performed the song in two films: Swing Parade of 1946, probably targeting white viewers, and Caldonia (Astor Pictures, 1945) which appeared to be for a black audience.

== Renditions by other artists ==
At the same time as Jordan's success, the song was also recorded both by Erskine Hawkins and Woody Herman. A review in Billboard magazine described Hawkins' version as "right rhythmic rock and roll music", possibly the first use of the term to describe a musical style. Hawkins' version of "Caldonia", featuring piano and vocals by Ace Harris, reached number two on the Billboard R&B chart and number 12 on the pop chart. Herman's version, arranged by the young Neal Hefti, reached number two on the broader chart.

In 1949, a version by Sugar Chile Robinson reached number 14 on the R&B chart. Later, James Brown recorded the song, with an arrangement by Sammy Lowe, as his first release for Smash Records in 1964. It appeared at number 95 on the Billboard Hot 100 chart (the R&B chart was suspended at the time). In 1974, Van Morrison covered the song with his Caledonia Soul Express band, releasing it as a single backed with his own song "What's Up Crazy Pup". However it failed to chart and its success remained confidential. In 1976, Muddy Waters performed the song with the Band at the group's final billed concert with original guitarist Robbie Robertson, the Last Waltz, along with Bob Margolin and Bobby Charles.

== Influence ==
In 1998, Jordan's version (as "Caldonia Boogie") was inducted into the Grammy Hall of Fame. In 2013, it was added to the U.S. National Recording Registry's list of songs that "are culturally, historically, or aesthetically significant, and/or inform or reflect life in the United States".

The recording is considered to be one of the "excellent and commercially successful" examples of the jump blues genre. As well, the song may have been of some influence on the later rock and roll genre. Little Richard often spoke of being influenced by Louis Jordan; Caldonia was the first non-gospel song he learned. The shriek on the Jordan record "sounds eerily like the vocal tone Little Richard would adopt" in addition to the "Jordan-style pencil-thin moustache".

== Sources ==
- Whitburn, Joel (1988). Top R&B Singles 1942–1988. Menomonee Falls, Wisconsin: Record Research. ISBN 0-89820-068-7.
