= Ain't Nobody Here but Us Chickens =

1946 song by Louis Jordan

Single by Louis Jordan and His Tympany Five
- A-side: "Let the Good Times Roll"
- Released: 1946
- Recorded: June 26, 1946
- Genre: Jump blues
- Length: 3:02
- Label: Decca
- Songwriters: Joan Whitney Kramer, Alex Kramer

"Ain't Nobody Here but Us Chickens" is a jump blues song, written by Alex Kramer and Joan Whitney. Louis Jordan and his Tympany Five recorded the song on June 26, 1946, and Decca Records released it on a 78 rpm record. It was added to the Grammy Hall of Fame in 2013.

The single debuted on Billboard magazine's Rhythm and Blues Records Chart on December 14, 1946. It reached number one and remained at the top position for seventeen weeks, longer than any other Jordan single. It also reached number six on the broader Billboard Best-Selling Popular Retail Records chart. The flip side, "Let the Good Times Roll", peaked at number two on the R&B chart.

Jordan's hit song popularized the expression "Nobody here but us chickens", but the phrase is older. Its first known appearance was as the punch line of a reader-submitted anecdote in Everybody's Magazine in 1908, in which a chicken thief tries to evade detection by tremulously telling the investigating owner, "'Deed, sah, dey ain't nobody hyah 'ceptin' us chickens." From there, it was picked up by newspapers and reprinted far and wide.
