= Beware (film) =

1946 film

- 1946 theatrical poster
- Directed by: Bud Pollard
- Written by: John E. Gordon (story)
- Produced by: Bud Pollard; Berle Adams (producers)
- Starring: See below
- Cinematography: Don Malkames
- Edited by: Bud Pollard
- Distributed by: Astor Pictures
- Release date: 3 July 1946
- Running time: 54 minutes
- Country: United States
- Language: English

Beware is a 1946 American race film directed by Bud Pollard, and released by Astor Pictures. The film is also known as Beware! (American poster title).

== Cast ==
- Louis Jordan as Lucius Brokenshire "Louis" Jordan
- Frank H. Wilson as Prof. Drury
- Emory Richardson as Dean Hargreaves
- Valerie Black as Annabelle Brown
- Milton Woods as Benjamin Ware III
- Joseph Hiliard as Harry Jones (student)
- Tommy Hix as Donald (student)
- Charles Johnson
- John Frant as Joe
- Ernest Calloway as Man in train station
- Dimples Daniels as Long-legged Lizzie dancer
- and "The Aristo-Genes" Girls Club

== Tagline ==
- "Look Up! Look Out! Look Sweet! the Maestro With a Beat"

== Soundtrack ==
- "Beware, Brother, Beware"
- "Long Legged Lizzie"
- "You've Got To Have a Beat"
- Louis Jordan and his orchestra - "Salt Pork, West Virginia" (Written by William Tennsyon Jr.)
- Louis Jordan and his orchestra - "Don't Worry 'Bout That Mule" (Written by William Davis and Charles Stewart)
- "The Land of the Buffalo Nickel"
- "Good Morning Heartache"
- "How Long Must I Wait"
- Performed by Louis Jordan and his orchestra - "Old Fashion Passion" (Written by Claude Demetrius)
