= Louis Jordan =

American musician, songwriter and bandleader (1908–1975)

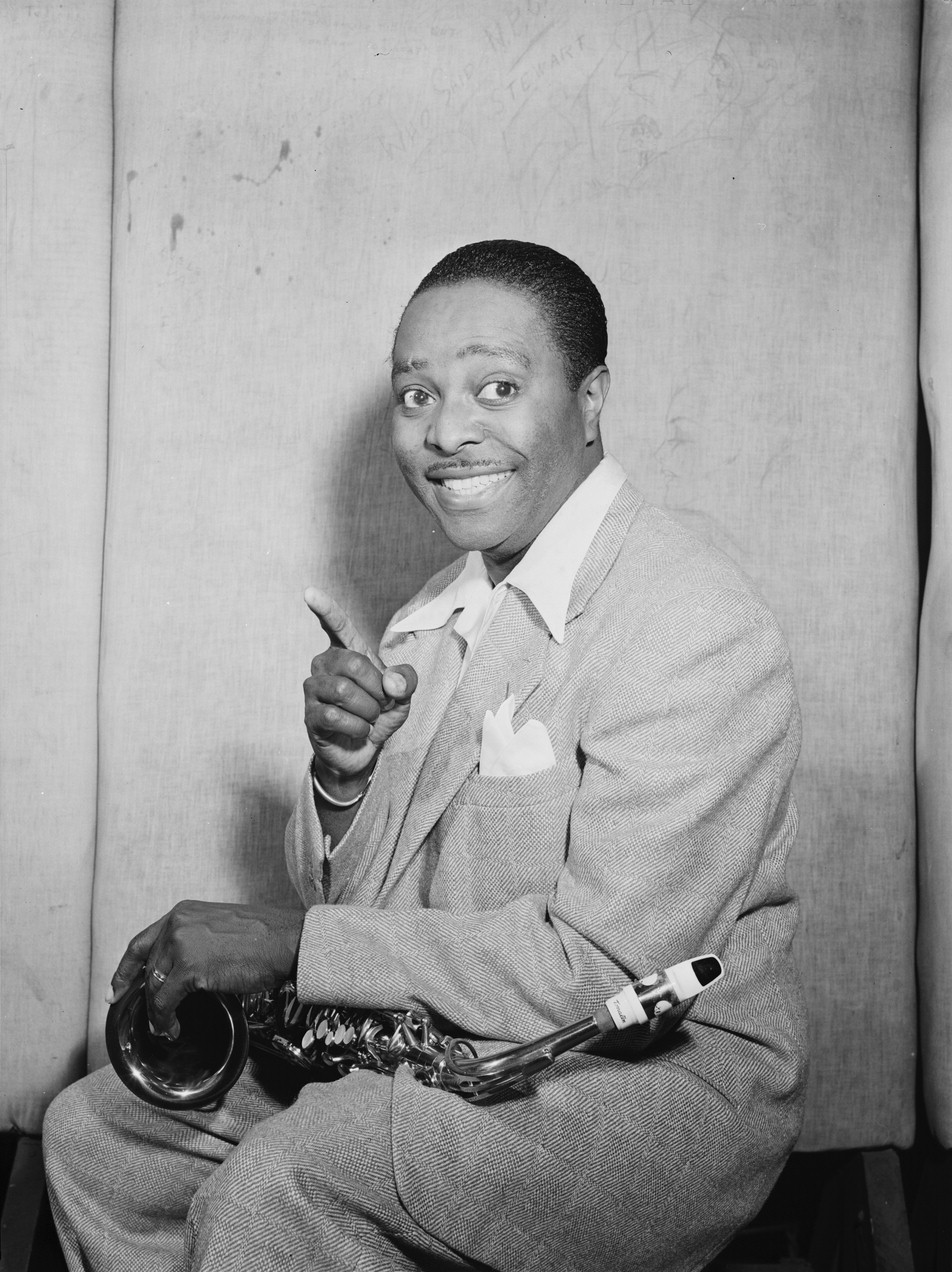
- Jordan in New York City, 1946

Background information
- Born: Louis Thomas Jordan; July 8, 1908; Brinkley, Arkansas, U.S.
- Died: February 4, 1975 (aged 66) Los Angeles, California
- Genres: Jazz; swing; jump blues; R&B; rock and roll
- Occupations: Musician; bandleader; songwriter; singer
- Instruments: Saxophone; vocals
- Years active: 1932–1974
- Labels: Decca; V-Disc; Mercury; Aladdin
- Formerly of: Tympany Five

Louis Thomas Jordan (Note: Jordan favoured the French pronunciation of his name (/ˈluːi/), commonly found in the southern United States) (July 8, 1908 – February 4, 1975) was an American jazz, blues and jump blues saxophonist, vocalist, songwriter and bandleader who was popular from the late 1930s to the early 1950s. Known as "the King of the Jukebox", he earned his highest profile towards the end of the swing era.

Specializing in the alto sax, Jordan played all forms of the saxophone, as well as piano and clarinet. He also was a singer with great comedic flair, and fronted his own band for more than twenty years. He duetted with some of the biggest solo singing stars of his time, including Bing Crosby, Ella Fitzgerald, and Louis Armstrong.

Jordan began his career in big-band swing jazz in the 1930s, coming to the public's attention as part of Chick Webb's hard swinging band, though he became better known as an innovative popularizer of jump blues—a swinging, up-tempo, dance-oriented hybrid of jazz, blues and boogie-woogie. Typically performed by smaller bands consisting of five or six players, jump music featured shouted, highly syncopated vocals and earthy, comedic lyrics on contemporary urban themes. It strongly emphasized the rhythm section of piano, bass and drums; after the mid-1940s, this mix was often augmented by electric guitar. Jordan's band also pioneered the use of the electronic organ.

With his dynamic bands that he called The Tympany Five no matter how many musicians were in it, Jordan mapped out the main parameters of the classic R&B, urban blues and early rock-and-roll genres with a series of highly influential 78-rpm discs released by Decca Records. These recordings presaged many of the styles of black popular music of the late 1940s, 1950s and 1960s and exerted a strong influence on many leading performers in these genres. Many of his records were produced by Milt Gabler who, in his later production work, played Jordan's music for Bill Haley as Haley wanted to transition from country & western to rock 'n' roll resulting in Haley's huge hit, "Rock Around the Clock".

Jordan was also an actor and a film personality. He appeared in 14 three-minute Soundies filmed for "movie jukeboxes" of the 1940s. He also worked as a specialty act in the Hollywood theatrical features Follow the Boys and Swing Parade of 1946. His very successful musical short Caldonia (1945) prompted three more feature films, all starring Jordan and his band: Beware; Reet, Petite and Gone; and Look-Out Sister.

Jordan ranks fifth in the list of the most successful African-American recording artists according to Joel Whitburn's analysis of Billboard magazine's R&B chart, and was the most popular rhythm and blues artist with his jump blues recordings of the pre-rock n' roll era. Though comprehensive sales figures are not available, Jordan had at least four million-selling hits during his career and regularly topped the R&B "race" charts, reaching Number 1 a total of 18 times, with 113 weeks in that spot over the years. He was also one of the first black recording artists to achieve significant crossover in popularity with the predominantly white mainstream American audience, having simultaneous top ten hits on the pop charts several times.

== Early life ==
Jordan was born on July 8, 1908, in Brinkley, Arkansas. His father, James Aaron Jordan, was a music teacher and bandleader for the Brinkley Brass Band and the Rabbit Foot Minstrels. His mother, Adell, died when Louis was young and his grandmother Maggie Jordan and his aunt Lizzie Reid raised him. Under the tutelage of his father, Jordan began studying clarinet at age seven, then saxophone. In his teens, he joined the Rabbit Foot Minstrels. He studied at Arkansas Baptist College, where he majored in music.

== Career ==
By the late 1920s Jordan was playing professionally. In the early 1930s, he played in Philadelphia and New York City with Charlie Gaines, as well as recording with Clarence Williams and his Blue Rhythm Boys and was briefly a member of the Stuff Smith orchestra. With Chick Webb's orchestra, he sang and played alto saxophone. In 1938, he started a band that recorded a year later as the Tympany Five.

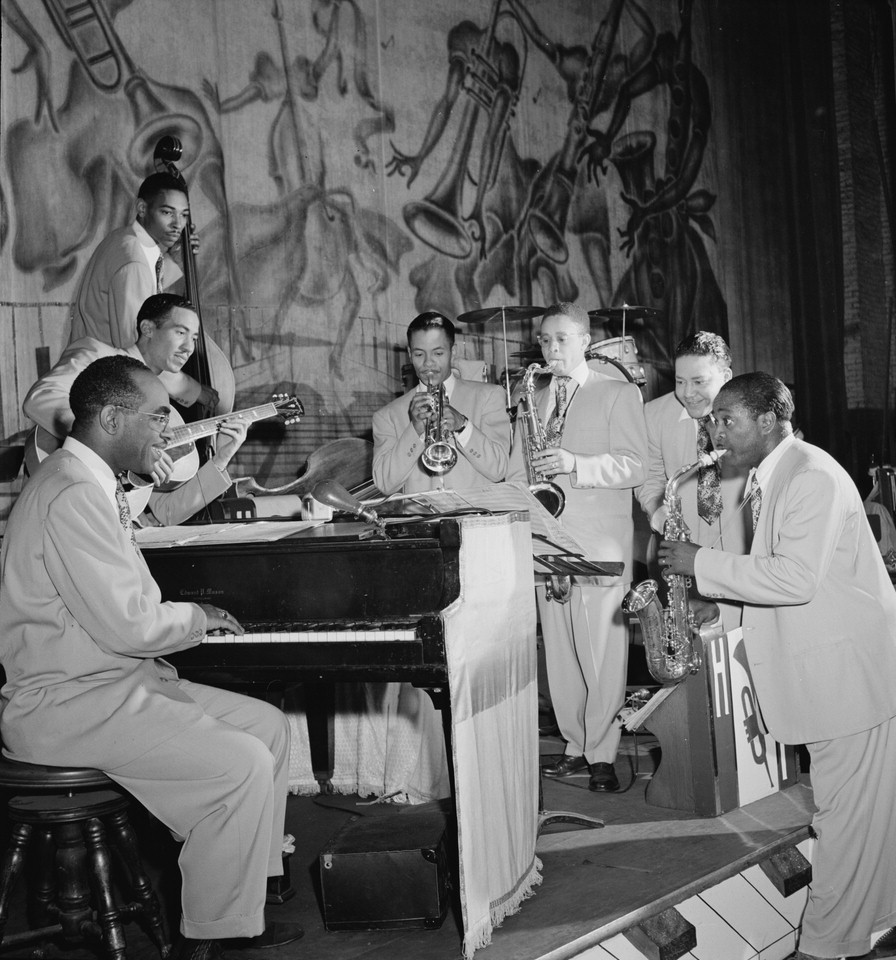
Louis Jordan's Tympany Five (c. 1946–1948)

Jordan's first band, drawn mainly from members of the Jesse Stone band, was a nine-piece group that he reduced to a sextet after being hired for a residency at the Elks Rendezvous club at 464 Lenox Avenue in Harlem. The band consisted of Jordan (saxes, vocals), Courtney Williams (trumpet), Lem Johnson (tenor sax), Clarence Johnson (piano), Charlie Drayton (bass), and Walter Martin (drums). In his first billing as the Elks Rendez-vous Band, his name was spelled "Louie" so people could avoid pronouncing it "Lewis".

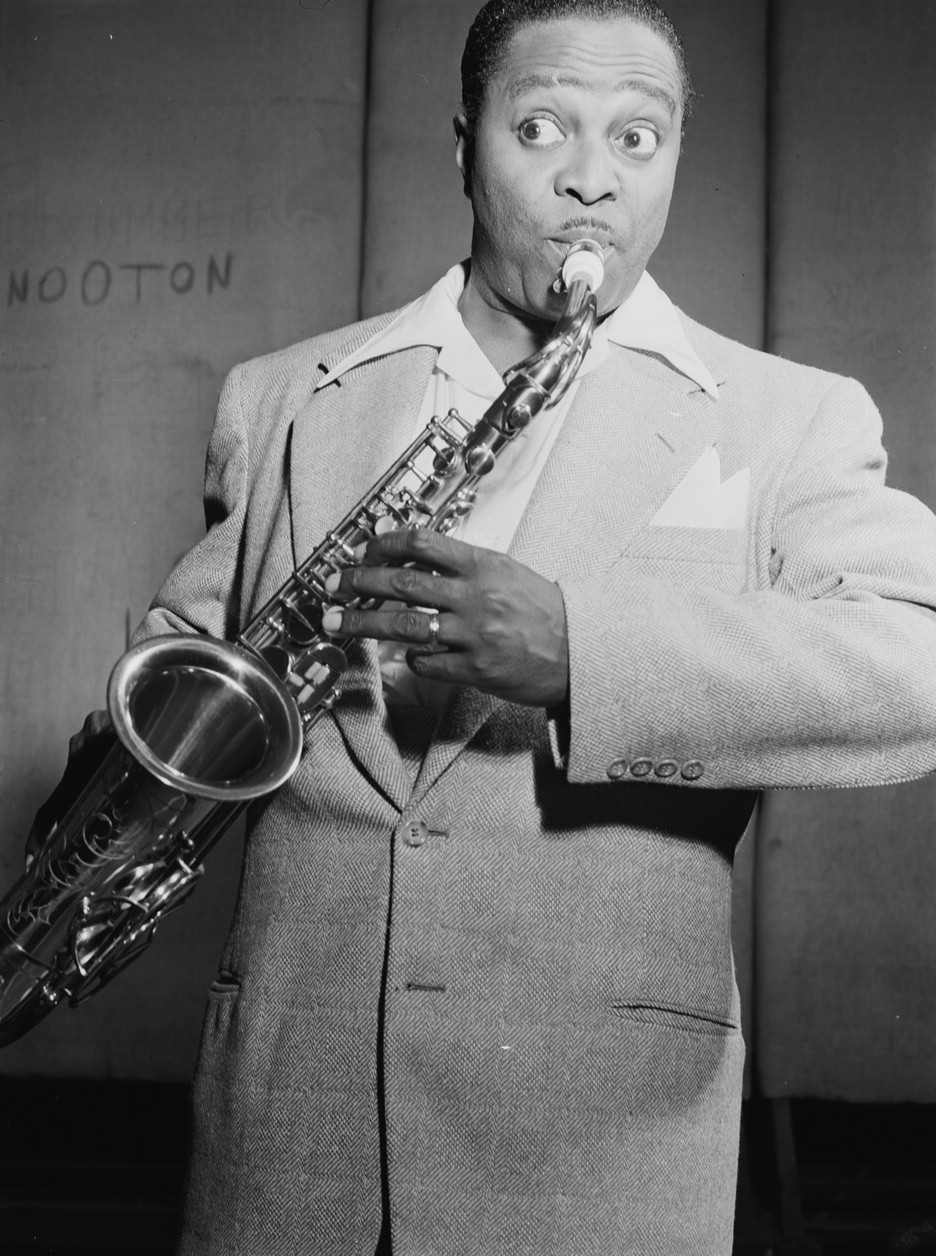
Jordan in New York, July 1946, shortly after getting second billing to Glen Gray's Casa Loma Orchestra at the Paramount.

In 1942, Jordan and his band moved to Los Angeles where he began making soundies, the precursors of music videos. He appeared on many Jubilee radio shows and a series of programs for the Armed Forces Radio that were distributed to American troops overseas. Jordan's career was uninterrupted by the draft except for a four-week Army camp tour. Because of a "hernia condition" he was classified "4F".

During the 1940s, Jordan and the band became popular with such hits as "Choo Choo Ch'Boogie", "Knock Me a Kiss", "Is You Is or Is You Ain't My Baby", and "Five Guys Named Moe". He recorded with Ella Fitzgerald both during and after their time with Chick Webb, also Bing Crosby and Louis Armstrong and appeared in films. Within a year of his breakthrough, the Tympany Five's appearance fee rose from $350 to $2,000 per night. But the breadth of Jordan's success and the size of his combo had larger implications for the music industry. The blues singer Gatemouth Moore said, "He was playing ... with five pieces. That ruined the big bands ... He could play just as good and just as loud with five as 17. And it was cheaper."

Jordan's raucous recordings were notable for using contemporary narratives. This is perhaps best exemplified on "Saturday Night Fish Fry", a two-part 1950 hit that was split across both sides of a 78 rpm record. It was one of the first popular songs to use the word "rocking" in the chorus and to feature a distorted electric guitar. Many sources describe this recording, and some others by Jordan, as "jump blues", because "it literally made its listeners jump to its pulsing beat", according to NPR. One source states that "Saturday Night Fish Fry" had a "lively jump rhythm, call-and-response chorus and double-string electric guitar riffs that Chuck Berry would later admit to copying".

He was inducted into the Rock and Roll Hall of Fame in 1987 as an "early influence". He is described by the Rock and Roll Hall of Fame as "The Father of Rhythm & Blues" and "The Grandfather of Rock 'n' Roll". The Hall also states that "Saturday Night Fish Fry" is "an early example of rap and possibly the first rock and roll recording". Not all critics agree with the importance of his work as a rock and roll influence. For example, Rolling Stone offers this take on Jordan's recordings from the late 1940s: "... the early idol of both Berry and Bill Haley, came closest, but his jump 'n' jive story songs were aimed as much at adults as teens, and any hillbilly flavor in his records was strictly a comedic device". The article agrees with Sam Phillips that rock and roll "specifically addressed and was tailored to teenagers".

Another source describes Jordan's jump blues style as combining "good-natured novelty lyrics (some with suggestive double meanings); [pushing] the tempo; [strengthening] the beat and [layering] the sound with his bluesy saxophone and playful melodies."

During this period, Jordan crossed over on the popular music charts placing more than a dozen songs nationally though his greatest success was with the Tympany Five dominating the 1940s R&B charts, or (as they were known at the time) the "race" charts. In this period, Jordan had eighteen Number 1 singles and fifty four in the Top Ten. According to Joel Whitburn's analysis of the Billboard magazine charts, Jordan ranks fifth among the most successful musicians of the period 1942–1995. From July 1946 through May 1947, Jordan had five consecutive number one songs, holding the top slot for 44 consecutive weeks.

Jordan's popularity was boosted not only by his hit Decca records but also by his prolific recordings for Armed Forces Radio and the V-Disc transcription program along with starring in short musical films and making "soundies" of his hit songs all of which helped make him popular with whites and blacks alike.

Jordan was certainly a significant figure in the development of rhythm and blues. According to the Rock & Roll Hall of Fame, he and Big Joe Turner laid the foundation for R&B in the 1940s, "cutting one swinging rhythm & blues masterpiece after another". Stepping away from his rhythm and blues style, Jordan started a big band in the early 1950s that was unsuccessful. Throughout the 1950s, illness kept him near his home in Arizona.

On June 1, 1952, Jordan performed at Wrigley Field in Los Angeles for the eighth Cavalcade of Jazz concert which Leon Hefflin, Sr. produced. On June 20, 1954, he and his Tympany Five returned for the tenth Cavalcade of Jazz concert.

Jordan signed with Aladdin for which he recorded 21 songs in early 1954. They released nine singles from these sessions; three of the songs were not released. In 1955, he recorded with "X" Records, a subsidiary of RCA, which had changed its name to Vik Records while Jordan was with them. Three singles were by released by "X" and one by Vik; four tracks were not released. For these sessions, Jordan changed and simplified his sound, wanting to be part of the rock and roll wave. In 1956, Mercury signed Jordan and released two albums and a handful of singles. His first album for Mercury, Somebody Up There Digs Me (1956), showcased updated rock-and-roll versions of previous hits such as "Ain't Nobody Here but Us Chickens", "Caldonia", "Choo Choo Ch'Boogie", "Salt Pork, West Virginia", and "Beware!" Mercury intended this to be a comeback for Jordan, but it was commercially unsuccessful, and the label let him go in 1958. Jordan later expressed disliking rock 'n' roll and commented "A lot of companies have asked me to record, but they insisted that I go into rock 'n' roll, and I didn't want to change my style". He recorded sporadically in the 1960s for Warwick (1960), Black Lion (1962), Tangerine (1962–1965), and Pzazz (1968) and in the early 1970s for Black & Blue (1973), Blues Spectrum (1973), and JSP (1974).

In the early 1960s, he toured in England with Chris Barber. Speaking in 2012, Barber recalled seeing Jordan at the Apollo Theater in New York:

playing with him was just frightening. It's a bit like an amateur guitar player from a back street who has just bought a Spanish guitar working with Segovia. He didn't make you feel small, but he was just so perfect in what he did. ... I still remember watching him singing, but he would accompany himself on the alto, and you were convinced he was playing the alto while he was singing. ... the breath hadn't gone from his last word before he was playing his alto and it seemed to be simultaneous. ... He got a very raw deal from history ... In the Chick Webb band there were two regular singers – Ella and Louis Jordan. And yet really, history has consigned him to just being a comedy vocal thing with a bit of rock and roll, and Webb's first alto ... but he was such a consummately good singer that it's sad that he wasn't known more for it.

Jordan remade some of his top hits for a 1973 LP, I Believe in Music: "Caldonia", "Is You Is or Is You Ain't My Baby", "Saturday Night Fish Fry" and "I'm Gonna Move to the Outskirts of Town". He also added new material.

According to a Billboard book cited by the Blues Hall of Fame, Jordan had "18 No. 1 hits on the race and R&B charts spent a total of 113 weeks in the top slot, almost twice as many weeks as any other artist in the history of rhythm & blues".

One publication of the Smithsonian Institution provided this summary of Jordan's music.

One important stylistic prototype in the development of R&B was jump blues, pioneered by Louis Jordan, with his group Louis Jordan and His Tympany Five. Jordan's group ... consisted of three horns and a rhythm section, while stylistically his music melded elements of swing and blues, incorporating the shuffle rhythm, boogie-woogie bass lines, and short horn patterns or riffs. The songs featured the use of African American vernacular language, humor, and vocal call-and-response sections between Jordan and the band. Jordan's music appealed to both African American and white audiences, and he had broad success with hit songs like "Is You Is or Is You Ain't My Baby" (1944).

=== Films ===
Jordan and the Tympany Five perform "Deacon Jones" in the 1944 film Meet Miss Bobby Socks.

The release of the 1945 musical short film Caldonia boosted Jordan's career due to roadshow screenings in support of his live performance. In addition to his performances in other mainstream films, such as Follow the Boys (1944), Jordan's appearance in Caldonia (1945) and that film's success led to roles for him in other race films, including those made by Astor Pictures: Beware! (1946), Reet, Petite, and Gone (1947), and Look-Out Sister (1947).

His prolific use of film as a promotional vehicle broke new ground, garnering praise from Billboard which wrote, "The movies have helped the one-nighters, which have also been helped by recordings, which have also helped the movies, which in turn have become more profitable. It's a delicious circle, and other bands are now exploring the possibilities."

== Personal life ==
=== Marriages ===
Jordan was married five times. His first wife, Julia (also called Julie) was from Arkadelphia, Arkansas. Soon after their wedding, Julia gave birth to a daughter, Patty, who turned out to be another man's child.

In 1932, Jordan met Ida Fields, a Texas-born singer and dancer, in Hot Springs. They married that year. Ida was six years his senior and a member of a traveling dance troupe called the Florida Orange Blossoms. Ida sued Jordan for bigamy in 1943. He claimed she was aware that he was still married. Ida was awarded a $70,000 judgment, later reduced to $30,000. She began billing herself as "Mrs. Louis Jordan, Queen of the Blues, and her Orchestra" before Jordan stopped it by stalling payments. In another court case, Ida was awarded a settlement of $50,000.

In 1942, Jordan married his childhood sweetheart, Fleecie Moore. They later divorced. In 1947, Fleecie discovered Jordan was having an affair with dancer Florence "Vicky" Hayes and attacked him with a knife. She was arrested and charged with assault. Jordan married Vicky on November 14, 1951, in Providence, Rhode Island. They separated in 1960.

He married Martha Weaver, a singer and dancer from St. Louis, in 1966. Weaver being a Catholic, Jordan sometimes attended Mass with her on Sundays, though he was raised a Baptist.

=== Financial problems ===
Jordan's popularity and success had waned by 1953. By that time, "rock 'n' roll had captured the world's attention, and Jordan's jumping R&B became a thing of the past". While he continued performing, this did not generate the level of income that million-selling recordings had provided.

In 1961, the Internal Revenue Service filed an income tax lien against Jordan. As a result, he sold property well below its worth to pay off debts. Musician Ike Turner stated in his autobiography, Takin' Back My Name, that he heard about his tax problems and contacted Jordan's booking agency in Chicago. Turner convinced the president of the company to send Jordan a check for $20,000. Jordan was unaware of this deed.

Jordan wrote or co-wrote many of the songs he performed, but he did not benefit financially from them. Many of the hit songs he wrote, including "Caldonia", he credited to Fleecie Moore to avoid an existing publishing arrangement. Their marriage was acrimonious and short-lived. After their divorce, she retained ownership of the songs. However, Jordan may have taken credit for some songs written by others, he is credited as the co-writer of "Saturday Night Fish Fry", but Tympany Five pianist Bill Doggett claimed he wrote it.

== Death ==
Jordan died of a heart attack on February 4, 1975, in Los Angeles. He is buried at Mt. Olive Catholic Cemetery in St. Louis, Missouri, the hometown of his wife Martha.

== Awards and legacy ==
On June 23, 2008, the United States House of Representatives passed a resolution introduced by Arkansas Representative Vic Snyder honoring Jordan on the centenary of his birth.

The United States Postal Service featured Jordan and his film for Caldonia in 2008 as part of its tribute to Vintage Black Cinema. "Vivid reminders of a bygone era will be celebrated in June through Vintage Black Cinema stamps based on five vintage movie posters. Whether spotlighting the talents of entertainment icons or documenting changing social attitudes and expectations, these posters now serve a greater purpose than publicity and promotion. They are invaluable pieces of history, preserving memories of cultural phenomena that otherwise might have been forgotten. The stamp pane was designed by Carl Herrman of Carlsbad, California."

The Rock and Roll Hall of Fame states that two of the most important originators of rhythm and blues were Big Joe Turner and Louis Jordan with his Tympany Five. The two artists helped to lay "the foundation for R&B in the 1940s, cutting one swinging rhythm & blues masterpiece after another". The Hall also describes Jordan as "the Father of Rhythm & Blues", "the Grandfather of Rock 'n' Roll" and "King of the Juke Boxes". Another source states that with Caldonia (1945), Jordan was "already crafting the classic rock 'n' roll sound". The Hall of Fame considers "his classic 'Saturday Night Fish Fry' (1949) as an early example of rap and possibly the first rock and roll recording".

The Blues Foundation hints that Jordan was a precursor to R&B: "Louis Jordan was the biggest African-American star of his era" and that his "Caldonia" reached "the top of the Race Records chart, as it was known prior to being called Rhythm & Blues in 1949".

Chuck Berry said that he modeled his musical approach on Jordan's. Berry changed the lyric content from black life to teenage life, and substituted cars and girls for Jordan's primary motifs of food, drink, money and girls. Berry's iconic opening riff on "Johnny B. Goode" bears a striking similarity to the intro played by the guitarist Carl Hogan on the 1946 hit "Ain't That Just Like a Woman"; Berry has acknowledged the debt in interviews. Other sources also indicate that Little Richard was influenced by Jordan. In fact, the artist said Caldonia was the first non-gospel song he learned; and the shriek (or "whoop") on the Jordan record "sounds eerily like the vocal tone Little Richard would adopt", in addition to the "Jordan-style pencil-thin moustache". James Brown and Ray Charles also said that Jordan's style had an influence on their work.

B.B. King cites Jordan as an influence and recorded an album of his tunes called Let the Good Times Roll: The Music of Louis Jordan. The band included Earl Palmer, drums, Dr. John, piano, Hank Crawford, alto sax, David "Fathead" Newman, tenor sax, and Marcus Belgrave, trumpet.

Jordan was inducted into both the National Rhythm & Blues Hall of Fame and the Blues Hall of Fame; and in 2018, he posthumously received a Grammy Lifetime Achievement Award. The Academy believes that he "led the way for rock and roll in the 50s. His recordings in the GRAMMY Hall Of Fame include: 'Ain't Nobody Here But Us Chickens', 'Caldonia Boogie', 'Choo Choo Ch'Boogie', and 'Let The Good Times Roll'".

According to Cleveland.com, "Louis Jordan had a profound impact on several African-American music genres that evolved during the first half of the 20th century ... He helped make jump blues, jazz and boogie-woogie mainstream forces. Jordan's legendary work would serve as a precursor to modern blues, rock and roll and R&B music".

In 1990, Five Guys Named Moe, a musical built around the songs of Louis Jordan, opened in London's West End and ran for over four years, winning a Laurence Olivier Award. It opened on Broadway in 1992 and received two Tony Award nominations. Tours and revivals continued into the 2020s.

== Discography ==
=== Charting singles ===
Release date	Title	Chart positions			Additional notes
Release date	Title	US R&B/Race charts	US Pop chart	US Country chart	Additional notes
1942	"I'm Gonna Leave You on the Outskirts of Town"	3			
1942	"What's the Use of Getting Sober (When You Gonna Get Drunk Again)"	1			
1943	"The Chicks I Pick Are Slender and Tender and Tall"	10			
1943	"Five Guys Named Moe"	3			
1943	"That'll Just 'Bout Knock Me Out"	8			
1943	"Ration Blues"	1	11	1	First "crossover" hit
1944	"Deacon Jones"			7	
1944	"G.I. Jive"	1	1		
1944	"Is You Is or Is You Ain't (Ma' Baby)"	3	2	1	
1945	"Mop! Mop!"	1			
1945	"You Can't Get That No More"	2	11		
1945	"Caldonia"	1	6		Retitled "Caldonia Boogie" for national chart
1945	"Somebody Done Changed the Lock on My Door"	3			
1945	"My Baby Said Yes"		14		Duet with Bing Crosby
1946	"Buzz Me"	1	9		
1946	"Don't Worry 'Bout That Mule"	1			
1946	"Salt Pork, West Virginia"	2			
1946	"Reconversion Blues"	2			
1946	"Beware"	2	20		
1946	"Don't Let the Sun Catch You Cryin'"	3			
1946	"Stone Cold Dead in the Market (He Had It Coming)"	1	7		Duet with Ella Fitzgerald
1946	"Petootie Pie"	3			Duet with Ella Fitzgerald
1946	"Choo Choo Ch'Boogie"	1	7		
1946	"That Chick's Too Young to Fry"	3			
1946	"Ain't That Just Like a Woman (They'll Do It Every Time)"	1	17		
1946	"Ain't Nobody Here but Us Chickens"	1	6		
1946	"Let the Good Times Roll"	2			
1947	"Texas and Pacific"	1	20		
1947	"I Like 'Em Fat Like That"	5			
1947	"Open the Door, Richard!"	2	6		
1947	"Jack, You're Dead"	1	21		
1947	"I Know What You're Puttin' Down"	3			
1947	"Boogie Woogie Blue Plate"	1	21		
1947	"Early in the Mornin'"	3			
1947	"Look Out"	5			
1948	"Barnyard Boogie"	2			
1948	"How Long Must I Wait for You"	9			
1948	"Reet, Petite and Gone"	4			
1948	"Run Joe"	1	23		
1948	"All for the Love of Lil"	13			
1948	"Pinetop's Boogie Woogie"	14			
1948	"Don't Burn the Candle at Both Ends"	4			
1948	"We Can't Agree"	14			
1948	"Daddy-O"	7			Duet with Martha Davis
1948	"Pettin' and Pokin'"	5			
1949	"Roamin' Blues"	10			
1949	"You Broke Your Promise"	3			
1949	"Cole Slaw (Sorghum Switch)"	7			
1949	"Every Man to His Own Profession"	10			
1949	"Baby, It's Cold Outside"	6	9		Duet with Ella Fitzgerald
1949	"Beans and Corn Bread"	1			
1949	"Saturday Night Fish Fry", Parts 1 & 2	1	21		
1950	"School Days"	5			
1950	"Blue Light Boogie", Parts 1 & 2	1			
1950	"I'll Never Be Free"	7			Duet with Ella Fitzgerald
1950	"Tamburitza Boogie"	10			
1951	"Lemonade"	5			
1951	"Tear Drops from My Eyes"	4			
1951	"Weak Minded Blues"	5			
