= Annie Get Your Gun (original Broadway cast recording) =

1946 cast recording by Ethel Merman et al.

Cast recording by Ethel Merman with Ray Middleton and members of the original cast, chorus and orchestra, under direction of Jay Blackton
- Released: 1946
- Genre: Show tunes
- Label: Decca

Professional ratings
Review scores
Source	Rating
Billboard	positive
AllMusic	5/5 stars

Annie Get Your Gun with Ethel Merman, Ray Middleton, and members of the original cast, chorus and orchestra, under direction of Jay Blackton, is a 1946 album containing a studio recording of that year's Broadway musical Annie Get Your Gun made by its original cast.

== Recording ==
The album was recorded ten days after the musical premiered on Broadway in May 1946.

Betty Ann Nyman and Kenny Bowers did not participate in the recording, so "Who Do You Love, I Hope?", the duet they sang in the Broadway production, was recorded for this album by Robert Lenn and Kathleen Carnes.

== Release ==
The album was originally issued as a set of six 10-inch 78-rpm phonograph records (cat. no. A-468). It contained 12 songs across 12 sides.

In 1949, the album became available on LP (cat. no. DL 8001).

In 2000, a new 24-bit remastering of this album was released on CD by Decca Records.

== Reception ==
The album reached number two on Billboard's Best-Selling Popular Record Albums chart.

In his retrospective review for AllMusic, William Ruhlmann calls the album "exactly what a cast album should be, an accurate representation of the music of a show." He also adds that "since this show was a landmark in Broadway history, that made the cast album an important contribution to musical history as well as an aural delight."

== Track listing ==
Album of six 10-inch 78-rpm phonograph records (Decca A-468)

All tracks are written by Irving Berlin.

Side 1
No.	Title	Artist(s)	Length
1.	"Doin' What Comes Natur'lly"	Ethel Merman with Annie Get Your Gun orchestra

Side 2
No.	Title	Artist(s)	Length
1.	"Moonshine Lullaby"	Ethel Merman with Garth, Turner and Bibb and Annie Get Your Gun orchestra

Side 3
No.	Title	Artist(s)	Length
1.	"You Can't Get a Man with a Gun"	Ethel Merman with Annie Get Your Gun orchestra

Side 4
No.	Title	Artist(s)	Length
1.	"I'm an Indian Too"	Ethel Merman with Annie Get Your Gun chorus and orchestra

Side 5
No.	Title	Artist(s)	Length
1.	"They Say It's Wonderful"	Ethel Merman and Ray Middleton with Annie Get Your Gun orchestra

Side 6
No.	Title	Artist(s)	Length
1.	"Anything You Can Do"	Ethel Merman and Ray Middleton with Annie Get Your Gun orchestra

Side 7
No.	Title	Artist(s)	Length
1.	"I Got Lost in His Arms"	Ethel Merman with Annie Get Your Gun chorus and orchestra

Side 8
No.	Title	Artist(s)	Length
1.	"I Got the Sun in the Morning"	Ethel Merman with Annie Get Your Gun chorus and orchestra

Side 9
No.	Title	Artist(s)	Length
1.	"The Girl That I Marry"	Ray Middleton with Annie Get Your Gun orchestra

Side 10
No.	Title	Artist(s)	Length
1.	"My Defenses Are Down"	Ray Middleton with Annie Get Your Gun male chorus and orchestra

Side 11
No.	Title	Artist(s)	Length
1.	"Who Do You Love I Hope"	Robert Lenn and Kathleen Carnes with Annie Get Your Gun orchestra

Side 12
No.	Title	Artist(s)	Length
1.	"There's No Business like Show Business"	Annie Get Your Gun chorus and orchestra

== Charts ==
Chart (1946)	Peak position
US Billboard Best-Selling Popular Record Albums	2
