= Annie Get Your Gun (soundtrack) =

Soundtrack album by various artists
- Released: 1950
- Recorded: March 25, 1949 — January 19, 1950
- Label: MGM

Professional ratings
Review scores
| Source | Rating |
|---|---|
| AllMusic | 4/5 stars |
| AllMusic | (1994 CD) |

The original soundtrack to the 1950 Metro-Goldwyn-Mayer film Annie Get Your Gun, starring Betty Hutton and Howard Keel, was released by MGM Records in the same year.

The album was released in several formats: as a set of four 10-inch 78-rpm phonograph records (cat. no. 50), a set of four 7-inch 45-rpm records (cat. no. K50) and as a 10-inch LP (cat. no. E-509).

The album spent several weeks at number 1 on the 45-rpm half of Billboard's Best Selling Pop Albums chart.

== Track listing ==
10-inch LP (MGM Records E-509)

All tracks are written by Irving Berlin.

Side 1
| No. | Title | Artist(s) | Length |
|---|---|---|---|
| 1. | "I've Got the Sun in the Morning" | Betty Hutton |
| 2. | "They Say It's Wonderful" | Betty Hutton and Howard Keel |
| 3. | "You Can't Get a Man with a Gun" | Betty Hutton |
| 4. | "My Defenses Are Down" | Howard Keel |

Side 2
| No. | Title | Artist(s) | Length |
|---|---|---|---|
| 1. | "Doin' What Comes Natur'lly" | Betty Hutton |
| 2. | "The Girl That I Marry" | Howard Keel |
| 3. | "Anything You Can Do" | Betty Hutton and Howard Keel |
| 4. | "There's No Business like Show Business" | Betty Hutton, Howard Keel, Louis Calhern and Keenan Wynn |

== Charts ==
| Chart (1950) | Peak position |
|---|---|
| US Billboard Best Selling Pop Albums – Best Selling 33⅓ R.P.M. | 3 |
| US Billboard Best Selling Pop Albums – Best Selling 45 R.P.M. | 1 |
