= Annie Get Your Gun (Doris Day and Robert Goulet album) =

Studio album by Doris Day/Robert Goulet
- Released: February 11, 1963
- Recorded: 1962
- Genre: Musical
- Label: Columbia Masterworks
- Producer: Thomas Z. Shepard

Doris Day chronology
Billy Rose's Jumbo (1962)	Annie Get Your Gun (1963)	Love Him (1963)

Robert Goulet chronology
The Wonderful World of Love (1963)	Annie Get Your Gun (1963)	In Person (1963)

Annie Get Your Gun is an album, released on February 11, 1963, by Columbia Records, starring Doris Day and Robert Goulet. It consisted of songs from the musical of the same name. The LP was issued on the Columbia Masterworks label in both mono and stereo (catalog numbers OL-5960 and OS-2360 respectively). The album has been reissued on CD by DRG (catalog number 19112).

The album was one of a number of albums produced by Columbia using a format similar to an original cast album of a musical play, but starring vocalists under contract to the company. Other albums in the same series included a John Raitt/Barbara Cook album of Show Boat (released 1962), a John Raitt/Florence Henderson/Phyllis Newman album of Oklahoma! (released 1964), and a Barbara Cook/Theodore Bikel album of The King and I (also released 1964). In this case, Doris Day and Robert Goulet were both major Columbia stars, and this was probably the most important album in this series.

At the time, Day was at the peak of her movie career and could not spare the time to go to the East Coast, where most of the production of this album took place. So she recorded her tracks at Columbia Records' Los Angeles studios and the tapes were sent to New York City, where orchestral arrangements were written by Philip J. Lang to fit Day's singing, a procedure rather contrary to normal practice. Goulet and the other singers, in turn, had to fit their keys and tempos to Lang's orchestral arrangements.

== Reception ==
Billboard notes "They do a fine job with the Berlin work, aided by sock ork (sic) and chorus work under Franz Allers."

Cash Box slated "Phil Lang has penned new sound-of-the-60s orchestrations for tunes that shine in any generation (e.g. 'The Girl That I Marry', 'They Say it's Wonderful, "There's No Business...,", 'I Got The Sun In The Morning")."

Variety thought "neither is especially suited to their assignments, lacking mostly the robust quality that has given these Berlin tunes their lift in the past" and thought that "both are big names in the LP market and the set will pick up strong sales because of them.".

American Record Guide notes that Goulet and Day "manage to dim the sparkle a little, but there's plenty of that and perhaps you won't even miss it."

In a Biographical Guide to the Great Jazz and Pop Singers, Will Friedwald referred to it as one of "Goulet's... best moments"

== Track listing ==
All songs composed by Irving Berlin

Track No.	Song title	Performer(s)
1	"Overture"	Orchestra
2	"Colonel Buffalo Bill"	Leonard Stokes
3	"I'm a Bad, Bad Man"	Robert Goulet
4	"Doin' What Comes Naturally"	Doris Day
5	"The Girl That I Marry"	Robert Goulet
6	"You Can't Get a Man with a Gun"	Doris Day
7	"They Say It's Wonderful"	Doris Day & Robert Goulet
8	"My Defenses Are Down"	Robert Goulet
9	"Moonshine Lullaby"	Doris Day
10	"I'm An Indian Too"	Doris Day
11	"I Got Lost in His Arms"	Doris Day
12	"Who Do You Love, I Hope?"	Kelly Brown & Renée Winters
13	"I Got the Sun in the Mornin'"	Doris Day
14	"Anything You Can Do"	Doris Day & Robert Goulet
15	"There's No Business Like Show Business"	Ensemble
