= Annie Get Your Gun – 1986 London Cast =

- Cover of the 2001 CD release

Cast recording by Suzi Quatro
- Released: 22 August 1986
- Recorded: Olympic Studios, Barnes, 14–15 July 1986
- Genre: musical
- Length: 55:58
- Label: First Night/Pinnacle
- Producer: Robert Mackintosh (album), Norman Newell (album), John Gale (theatre), Al Waxman (theatre), Anita Waxman (theatre)

Suzi Quatro chronology
Main Attraction (1982)	Annie Get Your Gun – 1986 London Cast (1986)	Oh, Suzi Q. (1990)

Singles from Annie Get Your Gun – 1986 London Cast
- 1. "I Got Lost in His Arms" Released: 3 October 1986

Annie Get Your Gun – 1986 London Cast is an album from the first London revival of Irving Berlin's musical Annie Get Your Gun, starring American rock musician Suzi Quatro as Annie Oakley and Eric Flynn as Frank Butler. The revival was a David Gilmore Chichester Festival Theatre production. It toured in the UK and then moved to the Aldwych Theatre in London's West End.

The album was initially released on the First Night/Pinnacle record label as Annie Get Your Gun (1986 London revival cast) and is sometimes (ambiguously) called Annie Get Your Gun (Original London Cast Recording) or Annie Get Your Gun: Original London Cast Recording. It is Quatro's ninth studio album.

== Background ==
The musical Annie Get Your Gun is based on a book of the same name, written by Herbert and Dorothy Fields. The story covers Oakley's romance with Butler while they were exhibition shooters in Buffalo Bill's Wild West show. In real life, Butler became Oakley's manager when she became the star attraction in Buffalo Bill's Wild West show. Oakley then became the first American female superstar.

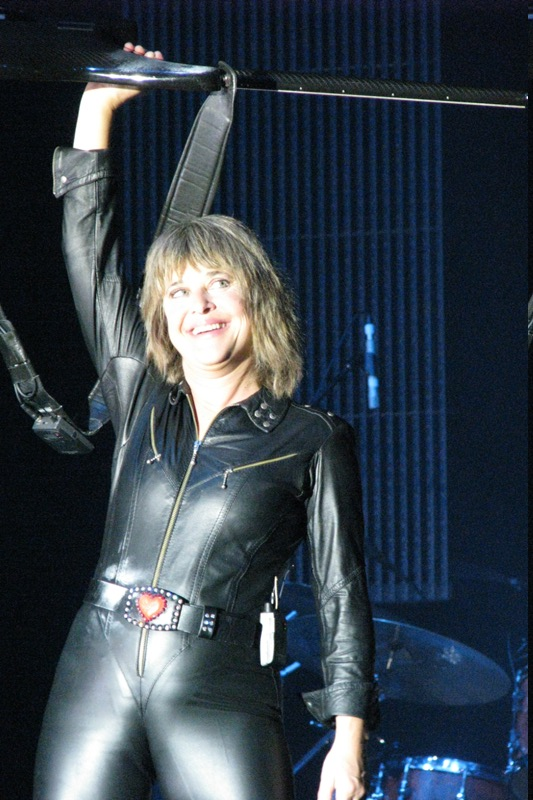
Quatro raising her bass guitar above her head during a rock performance at AIS Arena in Canberra, Australia on 26 September 2007

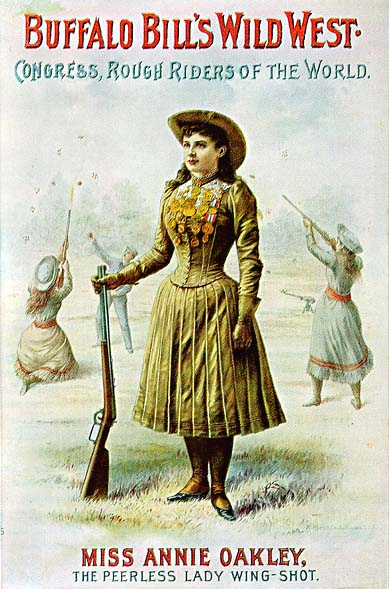
The real Oakley in a Wild West show poster

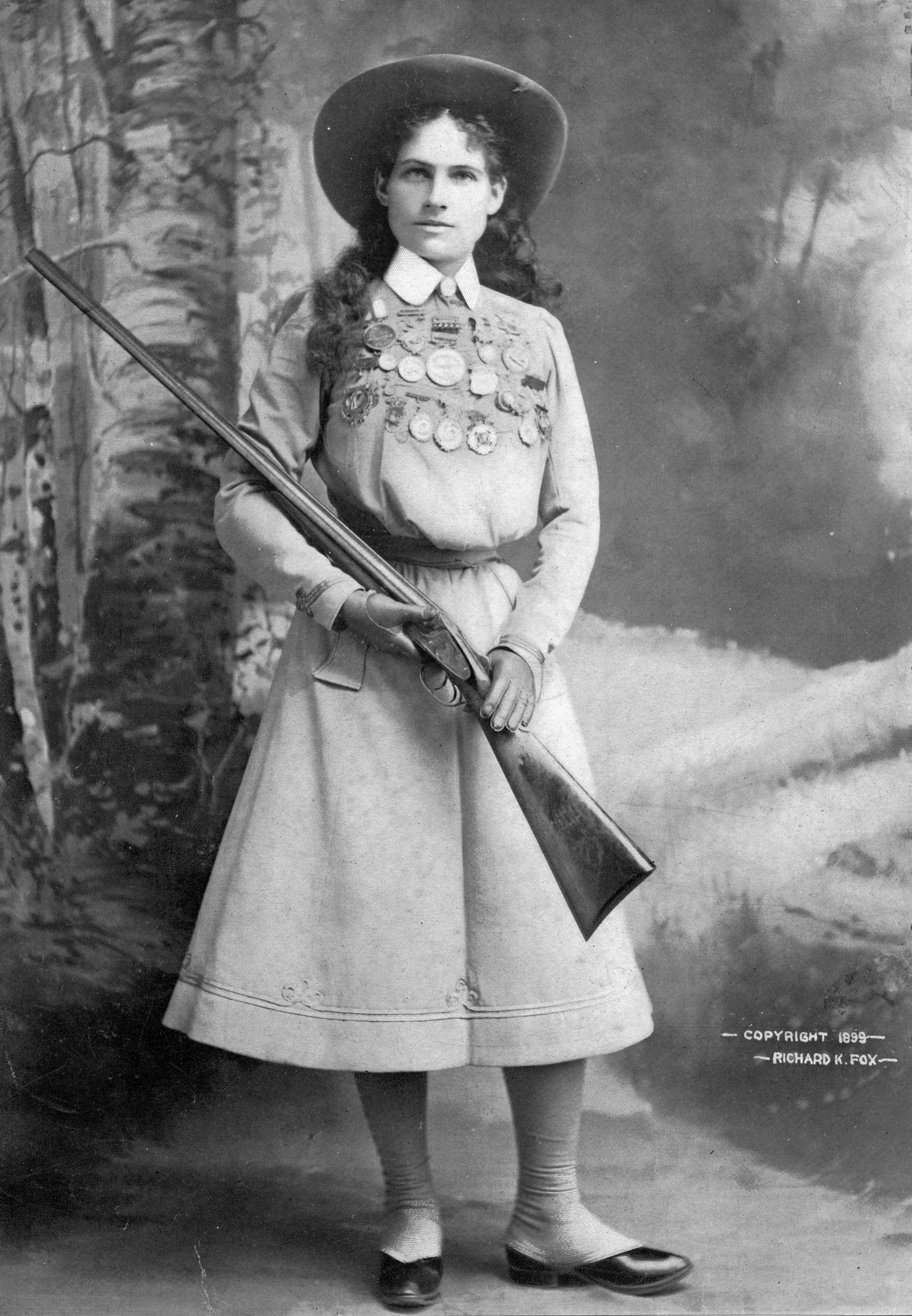
The real Oakley circa 1899

On 12 April 1982 Quatro appeared in a BBC television program called An Evening with Andrew Lloyd Webber. During his show, Webber suggested that Quatro should star in Annie Get Your Gun.

== Names ==
According to its publisher, this album is called Annie Get Your Gun – 1986 London Cast.

It was originally released as Annie Get Your Gun (1986 London revival cast).

The album is sometimes ambiguously referred to as Annie Get Your Gun (Original London Cast Recording) or Annie Get Your Gun: Original London Cast Recording. The term "original cast recording" is ambiguous because it can mean either the cast of the first ever performance of a musical in a particular city, or the cast of the première of a particular production (which may be a revival). The album's cover contains the words "Original London Cast Recording" and its catalogue number contains the characters "OCR" (which stand for Original Cast Recording). This 1986 production is actually the first West End (London) revival of the musical — the first ever London performance of Annie Get Your Gun (starring Dolores Gray) was in 1947.

== Recording, production ==
There were different teams of producers for the theatre and the album.

John Gale was the executive producer for the theatre, with Al Waxman and Anita Waxman as associate producers.

Robert Mackintosh was executive producer for the album, with Norman Newell as record producer. The album was recorded at Olympic Studios, Barnes, on 14–15 July 1986.

== Touring ==
15 April 1986 – 14 June 1986: Annie Get Your Gun opened at the Chichester Festival Theatre.

21 June 1986 – 12 July 1986: the production then moved to the Theatre Royal, Plymouth.

29 July 1986 – 4 October 1986: finally, the musical moved to the Aldwych Theatre in the London's West End.

== Track listing ==
All songs were written by Irving Berlin.

No.	Title	Performer(s)	Length
1	"Overture"	orchestra	2:08
2	"Colonel Buffalo Bill"	Matt Zimmerman, ensemble, orchestra	3:15
3	"I'm a Bad, Bad Man" or "I'm a Bad Bad Man" (according to the CD booklet)	Eric Flynn, girls, orchestra	2:27
4	"Doin' What Comes Natur'lly" or "Doin' What Comes Naturally" (according to the CD booklet)	Suzi Quatro, kids, Berwick Kaler, orchestra	3:35
5	"The Girl That I Marry"	Flynn, orchestra	1:08
6	"You Can't Get a Man with a Gun"	Quatro, orchestra	2:44
7	"There's No Business Like Show Business"	Zimmerman, Edmund Hockridge, Flynn, Quatro, orchestra	4:12
8	"They Say It's Wonderful"	Flynn, Quatro, orchestra	4:29
9	"Moonshine Lullaby"	Quatro, Tony Pedretti, Steve Fortune, Peter Ledbury, Tony O'Rourke, orchestra	3:47
10	"My Defences Are Down"	Flynn, chorus, orchestra	3:25
11	"Wild Horse Ceremonial Dance" also known as "Drum Dance" or "Ceremonial Dance" (according to Ovrtur)	Peter Lucadou-Wells, Indians, orchestra	4:03
12	"I'm an Indian Too"	Quatro, orchestra	3:19
13	"I Got Lost in His Arms"	Quatro, ensemble, orchestra	3:04
14	"I Got the Sun in the Morning"	Quatro, ensemble, orchestra	4:54
15	"Old Fashioned Wedding" also known as "An Old-Fashioned Wedding" or "An Old Fashioned Wedding" (according to Ovrtur)	Quatro, Flynn, orchestra	2:27
16	"Anything You Can Do"	Quatro, Flynn, orchestra	3:22
17	"They Say It's Wonderful" (reprise)	full company, orchestra	1:36
18	"There's No Business Like Show Business" (reprise)	ensemble, orchestra	2:03

== Personnel ==
Main players

- Roger Alborough – Pawnee's messenger, Mr Schulyer Adams
- John Conroy – Mac
- Eric Flynn – Frank Butler
- Steve Fortune – railwayman, majordomo
- Anne Grayson – Mrs Sylvia Potter-Porter
- Edmund Hockridge – Buffalo Bill
- Michael G. Jones – Pawnee Bill
- Berwick Kaler – Foster Wilson, Chief Sitting Bull
- Peter Ledbury – railwayman
- Peter Lucadou-Wells – The Wild Horse
- Tony O'Rourke – railwayman, Mr Clay
- Tony Pedretti – conductor
- Suzi Quatro – Annie Oakley
- Maureen Scott – Dolly Tate
- Sarah Woollett – Mrs Schulyer Adams
- Matt Zimmerman – Charlie Davenport

Indians, cowboys, girls, and ball guests

- Roger Alborough – (also a main player)
- Francesca Coker
- Richard Cuerden
- Steve Fortune – (also a main player)
- Adam Goodfellow
- Anne Grayson – (also a main player)
- Karen Halliday
- Peter Ledbury – (also a main player)
- Peter Lucadou-Wells – (also a main player)
- Tony O'Rourke – (also a main player)
- Tony Pedretti – (also a main player)
- Mikaela Ryden
- Robin Salter
- Taffy Taylor
- Tricia Tomlinson
- Nichola Treherne
- Helene Whitcombe
- Sarah Woollett – (also a main player)

Kids

- Rosie Freshwater – Nellie
- Richard Hanson-Smith – Little Jake
- Abigail Painter – Minnie
- Tiffany-Alice Pershke – Jessie

Orchestra

- Andy Barnwell – woodwinds
- Dennis Bowden – bass
- Myrtle Bruce-Mitford – cello
- Colin Courtney – woodwinds
- Fred Crossman – horn
- Leslie Davis – violin
- Ruth Dawson – violin
- Martin Gill – violin
- Mark Graham – trombone
- David Hulley – percussion
- Grant Hossack – production musical director
- Dave Land – trumpet
- Rosalyn Lishak – violin
- Louise Martin – harp
- Andy Mitchell – trumpet
- John Mayer – violin
- Andy Panayi – woodwinds
- Robert Purvis – assistant musical director, keyboards
- Michael Rennie – leader

Production, etc.

- Toby Alington – assistant recording engineer
- Bill Bray – lighting design
- Richard Bush – sleeve artwork
- Deirdre Clancy – costume design
- John Craig – co-ordinated for First Night Records
- David Firman – music supervision and arrangement
- John Gale – executive producer (theatre)
- Matthew Gale – sound design
- David Gilmore – director
- Roger Glossop – set design
- Keith Grant – recording engineer
- Suzanne Hywel – choreography (assistant)
- Jon King – assistant recording engineer
- Michael Lynas – with thanks to ...
- Robert Mackintosh – executive producer (album)
- Jerome Minskoff – presented by ...
- James M. Nederlander – presented by ...
- Norman Newell – record producer
- Gerry O'Riordan (incorrectly spelt Gerry O'Riordon in the CD booklet) – assistant recording engineer
- Anthony Van Laast – choreography
- Duncan C. Weldon – presented by ...
- Al Waxman – associate producer (theatre)
- Anita Waxman – associate producer (theatre)

== Release history ==
Date	Label	Format	Catalogue
22 August 1986	First Night/Pinnacle	LP	CAST4
22 August 1986	First Night/Pinnacle	cassette	CASTC4
22 August 1986	First Night/Pinnacle	CD	CASTCD4
1995	First Night Records	CD	6024
1996	First Night Records	CD	
2001	First Night Records	CD	OCR CD6024

On 3 October 1986, Quatro's songs "I Got Lost in His Arms" and "You Can't Get a Man with a Gun" were released as a single.

Quatro's "I Got Lost in His Arms" has also been included in the compilation albums The Divas Collection (2003) and Songs from the Greatest Musicals (2008).
