= Annie Get Your Gun =

Annie Get Your Gun may refer to:

- Annie Get Your Gun (musical), a 1946 musical play
- Annie Get Your Gun (film), a 1950 film version of the 1946 musical
  - Annie Get Your Gun (soundtrack), a 1950 album containing the film's soundtrack
- Annie Get Your Gun (Doris Day-Robert Goulet album), 1963, with Doris Day and Robert Goulet
- Annie Get Your Gun – 1986 London Cast, an album from the musical's UK tour and London revival, with Suzi Quatro and Eric Flynn
- "Annie Get Your Gun" (song), by the band Squeeze
