= Annie Get Your Gun (film) =

1950 film by Busby Berkeley, George Sidney, Charles Walters

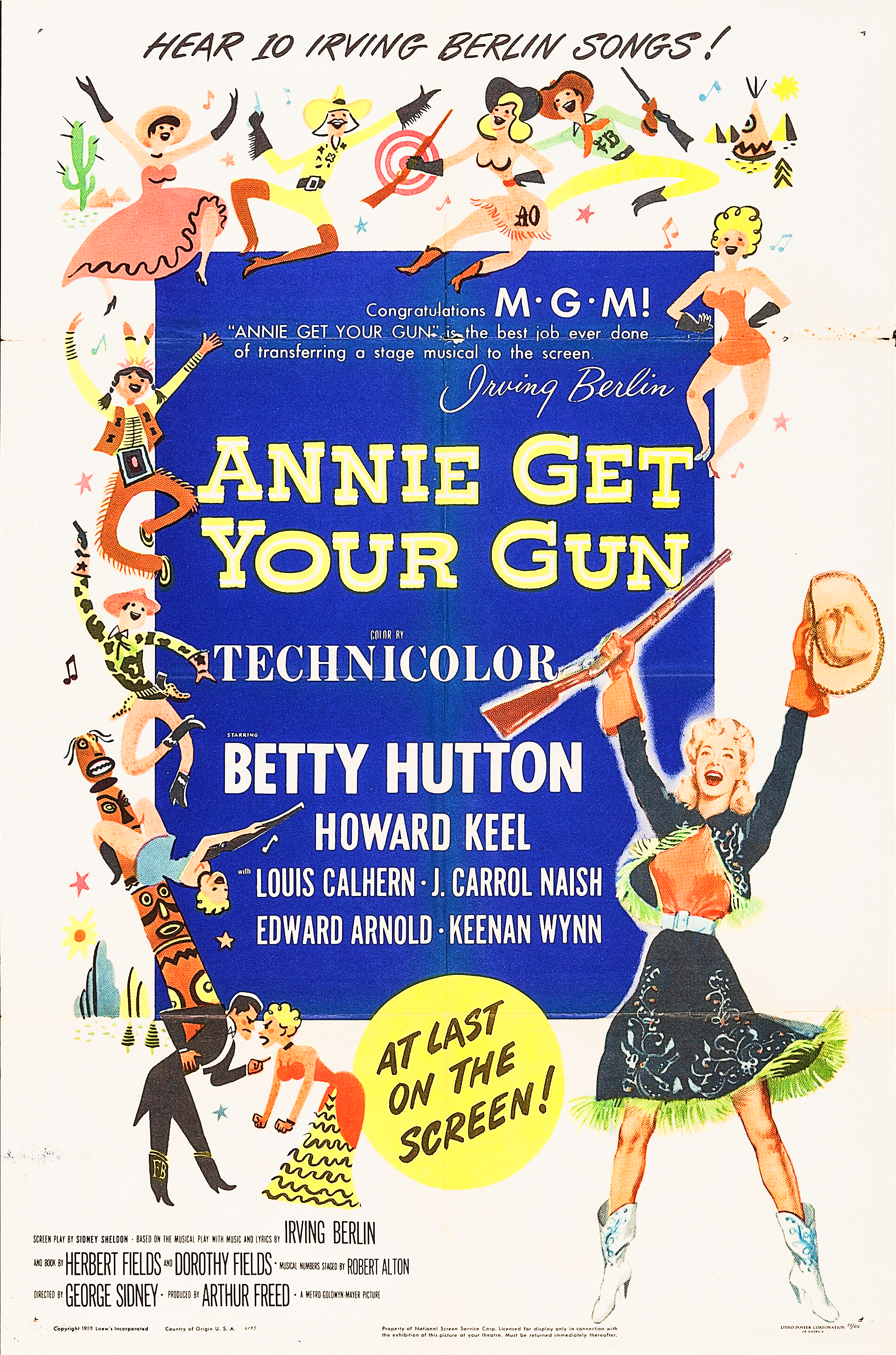
- Theatrical release poster
- Directed by: George Sidney
- Screenplay by: Sidney Sheldon
- Based on: Annie Get Your Gun; 1946 book by Dorothy Fields; Herbert Fields
- Produced by: Arthur Freed; Roger Edens
- Starring: Betty Hutton; Howard Keel; Louis Calhern; Keenan Wynn; Benay Venuta; J. Carrol Naish
- Cinematography: Charles Rosher
- Edited by: James E. Newcom
- Music by: Songs: (lyrics and music by) Irving Berlin; Music Direction: Adolph Deutsch; Additional music: Roger Edens
- Color process: Technicolor
- Production company: Metro-Goldwyn-Mayer
- Distributed by: Loew's, Inc.
- Release date: May 17, 1950
- Running time: 107 minutes
- Country: United States
- Language: English
- Budget: $3,734,000
- Box office: $7,756,000

Annie Get Your Gun is a 1950 American musical Technicolor comedy film loosely based on the life of sharpshooter Annie Oakley. The Metro-Goldwyn-Mayer release, with music and lyrics by Irving Berlin and a screenplay by Sidney Sheldon based on the 1946 musical, was directed by George Sidney. Despite several production and casting problems (Judy Garland was fired from the lead role after a month of filming in which she clashed with the director and repeatedly showed up late or not at all), the film won the Academy Award for Best Scoring of a Musical Picture and received three other nominations. Star Betty Hutton was recognized with a Golden Globe nomination for Best Actress.

== Plot ==
In a small town in Ohio, Annie Oakley and her extraordinary shooting skills catch the attention of Foster Wilson, proprietor of the hotel where Buffalo Bill and members of his Wild West Show, including renowned marksman Frank Butler, are staying. Upon meeting Frank, Annie is instantly smitten with him. Wilson enters Annie in a shooting competition against Butler, which Annie easily wins.

Annie impresses everyone with her unmatched marksmanship, including Buffalo Bill himself and she is asked to join the show. However, Annie's success puts a strain on her budding romance with Frank. He is jealous of Annie's shooting skills and feels emasculated, leading to a clash of egos.

Annie's rise to stardom continues as she becomes the star attraction of the show, overshadowing Frank's own act. She even tours Europe and becomes the adopted daughter to Native American chief Sitting Bull, who refers to Annie as "Little Sure Shot". In an attempt to regain his former glory, Frank challenges Annie to another shooting competition.

As the shooting competition approaches, Annie and Frank's relationship becomes strained, with each wanting to prove their superiority. However, during the competition, Annie intentionally misses her shots (with some surreptitious advice, and a doctored rifle, from Sitting Bull, who reminds her of her own dictum that "you can't get a man with a gun"), realizing that her happiness lies not in outshining Frank but in being with him. She sacrifices her own victory for the sake of their love.

Recognizing Annie's selflessness and genuine love, Frank's heart softens, and he realizes that he does not need to be the best to be happy. The two reconcile, reaffirming their love for each other.

The film concludes with a triumphant performance by Annie and Frank, who have mended their relationship and rediscovered their shared passion and are circled by the show members on horseback, solidifying the pair's place as the stars of the Wild West Show.

== Cast ==
- Betty Hutton as Annie Oakley
- Howard Keel as Frank Butler
- Louis Calhern as Col. William F. Cody (Buffalo Bill)
- Keenan Wynn as Charlie Davenport
- Benay Venuta as Dolly Tate
- J. Carrol Naish as Chief Sitting Bull
- Edward Arnold as Pawnee Bill
- Clinton Sundberg as Foster Wilson
- John War Eagle as Indian Brave (uncredited)
- Chief Yowlachie as Little Horse (uncredited)

== Musical numbers ==
1. "Colonel Buffalo Bill" — Charlie, Dolly, Ensemble
2. "Doin' What Comes Natur'lly" — Annie, Siblings
3. "The Girl That I Marry" — Frank
4. "You Can't Get a Man with a Gun" — Annie
5. "There's No Business Like Show Business" — Frank, Buffalo Bill, Charlie Davenport, Annie with ensemble
6. "They Say It's Wonderful" — Annie, Frank
7. "There's No Business Like Show Business (Reprise)" — Annie
8. "My Defenses Are Down" — Frank, Ensemble
9. "I'm an Indian Too" — Annie
10. "I Got the Sun in the Morning" — Annie
11. "Anything You Can Do" - Annie, Frank

The film adaptation cut the following numbers from the original score: "I'm a Bad, Bad Man", "Moonshine Lullaby", and "I Got Lost in His Arms" ("An Old Fashioned Wedding" was written for the 1966 revival). The 2000 compact disc release of the soundtrack includes all of the film's numbers and "Let's Go West Again" (a Hutton number deleted before the film's release), an alternative take of Wynn's "Colonel Buffalo Bill", and Garland's renditions of Annie's pieces.

== Production history ==
The film was originally budgeted at $1.5 million, with $600,000 payable to Irving Berlin and Dorothy and Herbert Fields for the score and the book, relatively cheap compared to the $2.3 million budget for Berlin's Easter Parade.

Betty Hutton played Annie Oakley, with Howard Keel (making his American film debut) as Frank Butler and Benay Venuta as Dolly Tate. Louis Calhern played Buffalo Bill, replacing Frank Morgan, who died of a sudden heart attack shortly after filming had begun.

Judy Garland, MGM's biggest musical comedy star, was originally cast as Annie Oakley. She recorded all her songs for the soundtrack and worked for two months under the direction of Busby Berkeley and dance director Robert Alton. Berkeley and Garland had worked together previously in the late 1930s and early 1940s in a successful series of backstage musicals teaming her with fellow juvenile star Mickey Rooney. However, Berkeley had been fired from the Garland/Rooney musical Girl Crazy in 1943 due to personality clashes with musical director Roger Edens and for driving Garland to collapse and subsequent doctor-ordered bed rest during the filming of the I Got Rhythm musical number. Six years later, producer Arthur Freed felt Berkeley was the right man to capture the spectacle needed for Annie Get Your Gun. But once again Berkeley was severe with Garland, and they immediately clashed. Unfortunately, Garland was suffering from overwork and exhaustion, the dissolution of her marriage to director Vincente Minnelli, and an addiction to prescription medication. Having recently completed the hit musical In the Good Old Summertime, she was in no condition to undertake a taxing role in another major musical production, and – based in part on her past experiences with him – she resented working with the demanding Berkeley. Struggling to make her characterization of Annie Oakley a real person and not just a broad caricature of Ethel Merman, Garland felt Berkeley had no understanding of how to translate the material to the big screen. She was put off by his bombastic directorial style, often leaving the set when he began shouting at the actors and crew. Garland complained about Berkeley to studio head Louis B. Mayer, attempting to have him removed from the film. After viewing Berkeley's footage to that point, producer Freed was disappointed and fired the veteran director, replacing him with Charles Walters. Despite this change, the underweight and physically exhausted Garland arrived late or not at all for each day's filming schedule. After a couple of warnings, MGM finally suspended Garland's contract in 1949 and she was fired from the picture. Garland, telling the press she was forced to leave the production against her will, traveled to Boston where she was hospitalized for several weeks to regain her health. As such, production on Annie Get Your Gun was suspended in May 1949.

Betty Garrett was considered as Garland's replacement, but her contract with the studio had expired and her agent asked for too much money for her to return. Ginger Rogers lobbied hard for the role, but the producers felt she was too mature and glamorous for the part. According to Rogers, studio head L.B. Mayer told her, "You stay in your silk stockings and high heels, Ginger. This part isn't for you." June Allyson was also briefly considered as was Doris Day, but Jack L. Warner, the head of Warner Brothers refused to loan Day to MGM. Betty Hutton pleaded for the role with both MGM and Paramount, her home studio, where she was the top musical comedy star. A loan-out deal was brokered between MGM and Paramount and Hutton won the part of Annie Oakley. After a five-month hiatus, shooting resumed with George Sidney replacing Charles Walters as director. Production resumed in July 1949 and lasted until September.

According to Betty Hutton, she was treated coldly by most of the cast and crew because she had replaced Garland. During an interview with Robert Osborne (first telecast on Turner Classic Movies "Private Screenings" on July 18, 2000), she recalled the other cast members being hostile and the MGM management as so unappreciative they neglected to invite her to the New York premiere. By all accounts, Hutton clashed with co-star Howard Keel. Years later, Keel recalled Hutton as "a scene stealer" and "insecure". In his autobiography Only Make Believe: My Life in Show Business, Keel wrote that on one occasion Hutton was upset because she felt Keel was upstaging her and they reshot the scene 35 times until she was satisfied with it. Hutton wrote in her memoir Backstage You Can Have that Keel was a "green horn" who tried to pull focus from her performance. She reportedly felt the only major cast member who treated her with kindness and respect was Louis Calhern. Hutton also stated that one day Judy Garland visited the set after being released from the hospital and when Hutton greeted her with a bouncy "Hiya', Judy!", she was brought up short by a seething string of profanities from Garland. Years later, the two women became friendly while each was performing in Las Vegas. According to Hutton, Garland admitted to her that she never felt she was right for the part of Annie and had been relieved when Hutton took over.

Only two production numbers were completed with Garland, "Doin' What Comes Naturally" and the elaborate "I'm an Indian, Too." MGM officially released these for the first time in the 1994 documentary That's Entertainment III. All of Garland's studio prerecordings for the film exist and were officially released by Rhino Records in 2000 for the film's first complete and remastered soundtrack CD, alongside Betty Hutton's renditions of the same numbers from the film.

== Release and reception ==
The film premiered at Loew's State Theatre in New York City on May 17, 1950. Despite the production problems, the film garnered mostly favorable reviews from critics. Bosley Crowther of The New York Times called it "a whale of a musical picture" with Hutton giving the lead role "a great deal of humor and bounce." Variety declared it "socko musical entertainment on film, just as it was on the Broadway stage ... Wonderfully stimulating, always entertaining, 'Annie' should do a lot to push the slogan, 'Movies Are Better Than Ever.'" Harrison's Reports wrote that "it holds one captivated from start to finish with the brilliance of its color photography, the lavish sets, the huge cast, the colorful costumes, the lilting Berlin tunes and, foremost, the truly wonderful performance given by the dynamic Betty Hutton, as 'Annie Oakley.'" Richard L. Coe of The Washington Post called it "a swell musical—a picture everybody will enjoy," adding that "while Annie is a juicy part, it's hard to think of anyone who could have done it as well as Betty has." John McCarten of The New Yorker wrote that it was "far superior to the usual line of Hollywood goods," though in comparison to the stage version, Hutton "never projects the hilarity of the business with anything like the enormous competence of Miss Merman." The Monthly Film Bulletin called Berlin's music "very enjoyable" but faulted the direction because "the staging of the numbers rarely takes advantage of the amplitude of the sets or the mobility of the camera," and thought that Hutton played the role "as a series of turns rather than as an acting performance."

The film was one of the top-grossing pictures of the year. During its initial release, MGM recorded it as earning $4,708,000 in the US and Canada and $3,048,000 overseas, resulting in a profit of $1,061,000.

In 1974, MGM withdrew Annie Get Your Gun from distribution, owing to a dispute between the studio and Irving Berlin over music rights, which prevented the public from viewing the film for 26 years. It was not until the film's 50th anniversary in 2000 that it was seen again in its entirety.

One of Hutton's costumes, the very first "Wild West Show" costume seen in the film for the reprise of "There's No Business Like Show Business" is on permanent display at the Costume World Broadway Collection Museum in Pompano Beach, Florida.

== Home media ==
The film was released on VHS and DVD on November 14, 2000.

== Awards and honors ==
- Academy Award for Best Scoring of a Musical Picture (won)
- Academy Award for Best Art Direction-Set Decoration, Color (Cedric Gibbons, Paul Groesse, Edwin B. Willis, Richard A. Pefferle) (nominee)
- Academy Award for Best Cinematography, Color (nominee)
- Academy Award for Best Film Editing (nominee)
- Golden Globe Award for Best Motion Picture Actress - Musical or Comedy - Betty Hutton (nominee)
- Photoplay Award for Most Popular Female Star - Betty Hutton (won)
- Writers Guild of America Award for Best Written American Musical - Sidney Sheldon (won)
