= John Gale (theatre producer) =

British theatre producer (1929–2025)

John Gale OBE
- Born: 2 August 1929
- Died: 10 May 2025 (aged 95)
- Education: Christ's Hospital; Webber Douglas Academy of Dramatic Art
- Occupations: Theatrical producer; artistic director; actor
- Employer: Chichester Festival Theatre
- Notable work: No Sex Please, We're British
- Title: Artistic director of Chichester Festival Theatre
- Term: 1985–1989
- Predecessor: Patrick Garland
- Awards: Officer of the Order of the British Empire (1987)

John Gale OBE (2 August 1929 – 10 May 2025) was an English theatrical producer and artistic director.

== Life and career ==
Gale was born 2 August 1929, the son of Frank Haith Gale and Martha Edith Gale (née Evans). He attended Christ's Hospital and the Webber Douglas Academy of Dramatic Art. In 1950, he married Liselotte Ann Wratten, and they had two sons. He was originally an actor until he produced Inherit the Wind in London in 1960.

He was the producer of the long-running West End comedy No Sex Please, We're British, which ran at three different West End theatres from 1971 to 1987.

He succeeded Patrick Garland as the sixth artistic director of the Chichester Festival Theatre in 1985. He directed five Festival seasons until 1989.

In 1986, Gale was executive producer for the Chichester Festival Theatre's first London revival of Irving Berlin's musical Annie Get Your Gun, starring Suzi Quatro as Annie Oakley and Eric Flynn as Frank Butler.

Gale was executive producer on the 1993 recording of Robert & Elizabeth (Chichester Festival Cast).

He was appointed OBE in the 1987 New Year Honours.

Gale died on 10 May 2025, at the age of 95.
