= Who Do You Love, I Hope? =

Single by Robert Lenn and Kathleen Carnes
- B-side: "There's No Business Like Show Business"
- Published: 1946
- Genre: Musical
- Songwriter: Irving Berlin

"Who Do You Love, I Hope?" is a popular song by Irving Berlin. It was published in 1946 and introduced in the musical Annie Get Your Gun

== Background ==
On opening night it was sung by Kenny Bowers & Betty Anne Nyman. In the 1946 cast recording, the song was sung by Robert Lenn & Kathleen Carnes. The song is a duet between two of the lead characters in the musical, Tommy Keeler and Winnie Tate.

== Other recordings ==
- The song was used in the Annie Get Your Gun album in 1963 when it was sung by Kelly Brown & Renée Winters.
