= Billy Rose's Jumbo (soundtrack) =

Soundtrack album by Various artists
- Released: November 12, 1962
- Label: Columbia Masterworks

Doris Day chronology
You'll Never Walk Alone (1962)	Billy Rose's Jumbo (1962)	Annie Get Your Gun (1963)

Professional ratings
Review scores
Source	Rating
Allmusic	3/5 stars

'Billy Rose's Jumbo' is the soundtrack album to the 1962 film of the same name featuring Doris Day, Stephen Boyd, Jimmy Durante and Martha Raye. Columbia Masterworks Records released the record on November 12, 1962. "Over and Over Again" was released as a single with "This Can't Be Love" as the B-side.

== Track listing ==
1. "Over and Over Again" (Rodgers, Hart)—Doris Day
2. "The Circus Is on Parade" (Richard Rodgers, Lorenz Hart)—Doris Day, Jimmy Durante & Martha Raye
3. "Why Can't I?" (Rodgers, Hart)—Doris Day & Martha Raye
4. "This Can't Be Love" (Rodgers, Hart)—Doris Day
5. "The Most Beautiful Girl in the World" (Rodgers, Hart)—Stephen Boyd (dubbed by James Joyce)
6. "My Romance" (Rodgers, Hart)—Doris Day
7. "The Most Beautiful Girl in the World" - Reprise—Jimmy Durante
8. "Little Girl Blue" (Rodgers, Hart)—Doris Day
9. "Sawdust, Spangles and Dreams" (Roger Edens) - Finale—Entire Cast
