= Annie Get Your Gun (musical) =

1946 musical by Irving Berlin

- Broadway 1946 Original Cast Album
- Music: Irving Berlin
- Lyrics: Irving Berlin
- Book: Dorothy Fields; Herbert Fields
- Productions: List: 1946 Broadway; 1947 West End; 1947 U.S. Tour; 1947 Melbourne; 1950 Film; 1958 Broadway revival; 1966 Broadway revival; 1975 Mexico; 1986 UK tour and London revival; 1992 West End revival; 1999 Broadway revival; 2000 U.S. Tour; 2009 London revival; 2014 UK Tour; 2023 London Palladium Concert
- Awards: 1999 Tony Award for Best Revival

Annie Get Your Gun is a 1946 musical with lyrics and music by Irving Berlin and a book by Dorothy Fields and her brother Herbert Fields. The story is a fictionalized version of the life of Annie Oakley (1860–1926), a sharpshooter who starred in Buffalo Bill's Wild West, and her romance with fellow sharpshooter Frank E. Butler (1847–1926).

The 1946 Broadway production was a hit, and the musical had long runs in both New York (1,147 performances) and London, spawning revivals, a 1950 film version and television versions. Songs that became hits include "There's No Business Like Show Business", "Doin' What Comes Natur'lly", "You Can't Get a Man with a Gun", "They Say It's Wonderful", and "Anything You Can Do (I Can Do Better)".

== History and background ==
Dorothy Fields had the idea for a musical about Annie Oakley to star her friend Ethel Merman. Producer Mike Todd turned the project down, so Fields approached a new producing team, Richard Rodgers and Oscar Hammerstein II. After the success of their first musical collaboration, Oklahoma!, Rodgers and Hammerstein had decided to become producers of both their own theatrical ventures and those by other authors. They agreed to produce the musical and asked Jerome Kern to compose the music; Fields would write the lyrics, and she and her brother Herbert would write the book. Kern, who had been composing for movie musicals in Hollywood, returned to New York on November 2, 1945, to begin work on the score to Annie Get Your Gun, but three days later, he collapsed on the street due to a cerebral hemorrhage. Kern was hospitalized, and he died on November 11, 1945. The producers and Fields then asked Irving Berlin to write the musical's score; Fields agreed to step down as lyricist, knowing that Berlin preferred to write both music and lyrics to his songs. Berlin initially declined to write the score, worrying that he would be unable to write songs to fit specific scenes in "a situation show". Hammerstein persuaded him to study the script and try writing some songs based on it, and within days, Berlin returned with the songs "Doin' What Comes Natur'lly", "You Can't Get a Man With a Gun", and "There's No Business Like Show Business". Unlike other shows where her love songs included comical elements as it was felt that Merman's style was not suited to romantic expression, Berlin included ballads for Merman to sing, including "They Say It's Wonderful" and "I Got Lost in His Arms". Merman claimed that "Irving Berlin made a lady out of me." Berlin's songs suited the story and Ethel Merman's abilities, and he readily composed the rest of the score to Annie Get Your Gun. Berlin also included upbeat tunes for her, including "I Got the Sun in the Mornin'" and "Anything You Can Do". The show's eventual hit song, "There's No Business Like Show Business", was almost left out of the show because Berlin mistakenly got the impression that Richard Rodgers did not like it. In imitation of the structure of Oklahoma! a secondary romance between two of the members of the Wild West Show was added to the musical during its development.

According to some sources, the role of Annie was originally offered to Mary Martin, who turned it down. This is not true. Dorothy Fields went to the hospital after Merman gave birth to her son to ask her if she would do the show. The show was conceived for Merman, but when time came to send out the post-Broadway national tour and Merman was unwilling to do it, Martin jumped at the chance, going on the road for approximately two years and belting out the songs, which had the effect of lowering her voice from its normal lyric-coloratura range to mezzo-soprano-alto.

For the 1999 revival, Peter Stone revised the libretto, eliminating what were considered insensitive references to American Indians, including the songs "Colonel Buffalo Bill" and "I'm An Indian Too". Stone said, "The big challenge is taking a book that was wonderfully crafted for its time and make it wonderfully crafted for our time... It was terribly insensitive...to Indians.... But it had to be dealt with in a way that was heartfelt and not obvious... In this case, it was with the permission of the heirs. They're terribly pleased with it." Stone also altered the structure of the musical, beginning it with "There's No Business Like Show Business" and presenting the musical as a "show within a show".

== Plot summary ==
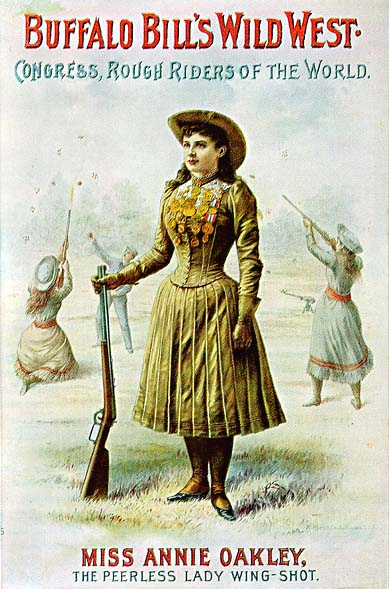
1880s poster

=== Act I ===
When the traveling Buffalo Bill's Wild West show visits Cincinnati, Ohio ("Colonel Buffalo Bill"), Frank Butler, the show's handsome, womanizing star ("I'm a Bad, Bad, Man"), challenges anyone in town to a shooting match. Foster Wilson, a local hotel owner, doesn't appreciate the Wild West show taking over his hotel, so Frank gives him a side bet of one hundred dollars on the match. Annie Oakley enters and shoots a bird off Dolly Tate's hat, and then explains her simple backwoods ways to Wilson with the help of her siblings ("Doin' What Comes Natur'lly"). When Wilson learns she's a brilliant shot, he enters her in the shooting match against Frank Butler.

While waiting for the match to start, Annie meets Frank Butler and is instantly smitten with him, not knowing he will be her opponent. When she asks Frank if he likes her, Frank explains that the girl he wants will "wear satin... and smell of cologne" ("The Girl That I Marry"). The rough and naive Annie comically laments that "You Can't Get a Man with a Gun". At the shooting match, Annie finds out that Frank is the "big swollen-headed stiff" from the Wild West show. She wins the contest, and Buffalo Bill and Charlie Davenport, the show's manager, invite Annie to join the Wild West Show. Annie agrees because she loves Frank even though she has no idea what "show business" is. Frank, Charlie, and Buffalo Bill explain that "There's No Business Like Show Business".

Over the course of working together, Frank becomes enamored of the plain-spoken, honest, tomboyish Annie and, as they travel to Minneapolis, Minnesota, on a train, he explains to her what "love" is ("They Say It's Wonderful"). Buffalo Bill and Charlie discover that their rival, Pawnee Bill's Far East Show, will be playing in Saint Paul, Minnesota, while the Wild West show plays in nearby Minneapolis. They ask Annie to do a special shooting stunt on a motorcycle to draw Pawnee Bill's business away. Annie agrees because the trick will surprise Frank. She sings her siblings to sleep with the "Moonshine Lullaby".

As Annie and Frank prepare for the show, Frank plans to propose to Annie after the show and then ruefully admits that "My Defenses Are Down". When Annie performs her trick and becomes a star, Chief Sitting Bull adopts her into the Sioux tribe ("I'm An Indian Too"). Hurt and angry, Frank walks out on Annie and the show, joining the competing Pawnee Bill's show.

=== Act II ===
Returning to New York from a tour of Europe with the Buffalo Bill show, Annie learns that the show has gone broke. Sitting Bull, Charlie, and Buffalo Bill plot to merge Buffalo Bill's show with Pawnee Bill's as they believe that show is doing well financially. Annie, now well-dressed and more refined and worldly, still longs for Frank ("I Got Lost in His Arms").

At a grand reception for Buffalo Bill's troupe at the Hotel Brevoort, Pawnee Bill, Dolly, and Frank also plot a merger of the two companies, assuming Buffalo Bill's show made a fortune touring Europe. When they all meet, they soon discover both shows are broke. Annie, however, has received sharpshooting medals from all the rulers of Europe worth one hundred thousand dollars, and she decides to sell the medals to finance the merger, rejoicing in the simple things ("I Got the Sun in the Mornin'"). When Frank appears, he and Annie confess their love and decide to marry, although with comically different ideas: Frank wants "some little chapel", while Annie wants "A wedding in a big church with bridesmaids and flower girls/ A lot of ushers in tail coats/ Reporters and photographers" ("An Old-Fashioned Wedding"^{o}). When Annie shows Frank her medals, Frank again has his pride hurt. They call off the merger and the wedding, but challenge each other to one last shooting match to decide who is the best shot.

On the ferry to the Governors Island match site, Dolly attempts to ruin Annie's chances by tampering with her guns. She is caught and stopped by Sitting Bull and Charlie. However, they then decide to follow through with Dolly's plan so that Annie will lose the match, knowing that would soothe Frank's ego allowing the two to reconcile and the merger to take place.

As the match is ready to begin, Annie and Frank's egos come out again with each claiming they are better than the other ("Anything You Can Do"). Sitting Bull convinces Annie to deliberately lose the match to Frank, reminding her that she "can't get a man with a gun." That done, Frank and Annie finally reconcile, deciding to marry and merge the shows.

Notes:

- This description is based on the 1966 revised book.
- In the 1999 book, Frank also deliberately misses his shots in the final match, which ends in a tie.
- ^{o} written for 1966 revision and included in 1999 Broadway Revival; not in the original production
- § omitted from the 1999 Broadway Revival

== Notable casts ==
Character	Original Broadway (1946)	Original West End (1947)	First U.S. Tour (1947)	First Broadway Revival (1958)	Second Broadway Revival (1966)	First West End Revival (1986)	Third Broadway Revival (1999)	Second U.S. Tour (2000)
Annie Oakley	Ethel Merman	Dolores Gray	Mary Martin	Betty Jane Watson	Ethel Merman	Suzi Quatro	Bernadette Peters	Marilu Henner
Frank Butler	Ray Middleton	Bill Johnson	Earl Covert	David Atkinson	Bruce Yarnell	Eric Flynn	Tom Wopat	Rex Smith
Dolly Tate/Davenport	Lea Penman	Barbara Babington	Jean Cleveland	Margaret Hamilton	Benay Venuta	Maureen Scott	Valerie Wright	Susann Fletcher
Buffalo Bill	William O'Neal	Ellis Irving	Jack Rutherford	James Rennie	Rufus Smith	Edmund Hockridge	Ron Holgate	George McDaniel
Chief Sitting Bull	Harry Bellaver	John Garside	Zachary A. Charles	Harry Bellaver	Harry Bellaver	Berwick Kaler	Gregory Zaragoza	Larry Storch
Tommy Keeler	Kenneth Bowers	Irving Davies	Tommy Wonder	Richard France	x (Note: Characters Tommy Keeler and Winnie Tate were cut in both this production and the 1986 West End revival cast)	x	Andrew Palermo	Eric Sciotto
Charlie Davenport	Marty May	Hal Bryan	Donald Burr	Jack Whiting	Jerry Orbach	Matt Zimmerman	Peter Marx	Joe Hart
Winnie Tate	Betty Anne Nyman	Wendy Toye	Billie Worth	Rain Winslow	x	x	Nicole Ruth Snelson	Claci Miller
Pawnee Bill	George Lipton	Edmund Dalby	Bern Hoffman	William LeMassena	Jack Dabdoub	Michael G. Jones	Ronn Carroll	Charles Goff

== Characters ==
- Annie Oakley—a sharpshooter in the Wild West show
- Frank Butler—the Wild West show's star
- Dolly Tate—Frank's flamboyant assistant; Winnie's sister (Charlie's sister in the 1966 version and the 1986 version as Dolly Davenport)
- Buffalo Bill—owner of the Wild West show
- Chief Sitting Bull—Sioux chief and holy man; Annie's protector
- Tommy Keeler§—knife-thrower in the Wild West show; Winnie's boyfriend; part Native American (not in the 1966 version nor the 1986 version)
- Charlie Davenport—manager of the Wild West show
- Winnie Tate§—Dolly's sister; Tommy's girlfriend and his assistant in the knife-throwing act (not in the 1966 version nor the 1986 version)
- Pawnee Bill—owner of a competing western show
- Foster Wilson—hotel owner
- Little Boy-show opens on him
- Annie's brothers and sisters: Jessie, Nellie, Little Jake, and Minnie (Minnie was written out of the 1999 revival)

Notes

- §Tommy and Winnie and their songs were written out of the film & 1966 revision. The 1999 revival restored their characters and songs.

== Musical numbers ==
=== Original 1946 production ===
Act I

- Overture — Orchestra
- "Colonel Buffalo Bill" — Charlie Davenport, Dolly Tate, and ensemble
- "I'm a Bad, Bad Man" — Frank Butler
- "Doin' What Comes Natur'lly" — Annie Oakley and her siblings
- "The Girl That I Marry" — Frank and Annie
- "You Can't Get a Man with a Gun" — Annie
- "There's No Business Like Show Business" — Frank, Buffalo Bill, Charlie, Annie, and ensemble
- "They Say It's Wonderful" — Annie and Frank
- "Moonshine Lullaby" § — Annie and siblings
- "I'll Share It All With You" — Winnie Tate and Tommy Keeler
- "Ballyhoo" — Riding Mistress and Show People
- "There's No Business Like Show Business" (Reprise) — Annie
- "My Defenses Are Down" — Frank and ensemble
- "Wild Horse Ceremonial Dance" — Wild Horse, Indian Braves and Maidens
- "I'm an Indian, Too" — Annie and ensemble
- Adoption Dance — Annie, Wild Horse and Braves

Act II

- Entr'acte — Orchestra
- "I Got Lost In His Arms" § — Annie
- "Who Do You Love, I Hope?" — Winnie and Tommy
- "I Got the Sun in the Morning" — Annie and ensemble
- "They Say It's Wonderful" (Reprise) — Annie and Frank
- "The Girl That I Marry" (Reprise) — Frank
- "Anything You Can Do" — Annie and Frank
- "There's No Business Like Show Business" (Reprise) — Ensemble

Notes

- §: omitted from the 1950 film version
- "Let's Go West Again" was written by Berlin for the 1950 film but was not used. However, there are recordings by both Betty Hutton and Judy Garland.
- "Take It in Your Stride" was a solo for Annie written for the original production. It was replaced by a reprise of "There's No Business Like Show Business" when Merman found the number too difficult. It was recorded by Liz Larsen for the album Lost in Boston.

=== 1999 revival ===
Act I

- "There's No Business Like Show Business" - Frank, Dolly, Winnie and Company
- "Doin' What Comes Natur'lly" — Annie, Kids and Foster Wilson
- "The Girl That I Marry" — Frank and Annie
- "You Can't Get a Man with a Gun" — Annie
- "There's No Business Like Show Business" (Reprise) — Frank, Buffalo Bill, Charlie and Annie
- "I'll Share It All With You" — Tommy, Winnie and Company
- "Moonshine Lullaby" — Annie, Kids, Ensemble Trio
- "There's No Business Like Show Business" (Reprise) — Annie
- "They Say It's Wonderful" — Annie and Frank
- "My Defenses Are Down" — Frank and Young Men
- Finale: "You Can't Get a Man with a Gun (Reprise)" - Annie

Act II

- Entr'acte: The European Tour — Annie and Company
- "I Got Lost In His Arms" — Annie
- "Who Do You Love, I Hope" — Tommy, Winnie and Company
- "I Got the Sun in the Morning" — Annie and Company
- "An Old-Fashioned Wedding" — Annie and Frank
- "The Girl That I Marry" (Reprise) — Frank
- "Anything You Can Do" — Annie and Frank
- "They Say It's Wonderful" (Reprise) — Annie, Frank and Company

"An Old-Fashioned Wedding" was written by Berlin for the 1966 revision, sung by Annie and Frank, and was also included in the 1999 revival

== Productions ==
=== Original productions ===
Annie Get Your Gun premiered on Broadway at the Imperial Theatre on May 16, 1946, and ran for 1,147 performances. Directed by Joshua Logan, the show starred Ethel Merman as Annie, Ray Middleton as Frank Butler, Lea Penman as Dolly Tate, Art Bernett as Foster Wilson, Harry Bellaver as Chief Sitting Bull, Kenneth Bowers as Tommy Keeler, Marty May as Charlie Davenport, Warren Berlinger as the Little Boy and William O'Neal as Buffalo Bill. It was Merman's and Berlin's longest-running show.

The musical toured the U.S. from October 3, 1947, starting in Dallas, with Mary Martin as Annie. This tour also played Chicago and Los Angeles. Martin stayed with the tour until mid-1948.

The show had its West End premiere on June 7, 1947, at the London Coliseum where it ran for 1,304 performances. Dolores Gray played Annie with Bill Johnson as Frank.

The first Australian production opened at His Majesty's Theatre in Melbourne on July 19, 1947. It starred Evie Hayes as Annie with Webb Tilton as Frank.

A French version, Annie du Far-West, starring Marcel Merkes and Lily Fayol, began production at the Théâtre du Châtelet in Paris on February 19, 1950, and ran for over a year.

=== 1958 Broadway revival ===
The first Broadway revival was staged in 1958 at the New York City Center, directed by Donald Burr and produced by Jean Dalrymple, director of the NYCC Light Opera Company. This production opened on February 19, 1958, and ran until March 2, for 16 performances. Betty Jane Watson played the role of Annie with David Atkinson as Frank, Margaret Hamilton as Dolly, James Rennie as Chief Buffalo Bill, and Jack Whiting as Charles Davenport. Included in the cast was Harry Bellaver, reprising his original role of Chief Sitting Bull. The program didn't list the performer who was to play Annie, and instead a "to-be-announced" statement was substituted for the name. At the last minute, Watson signed for the role. Even the program for the second week of the two-week engagement didn't list her name, except as understudy; this was the first time in memory that a leading performer wasn't listed.

=== 1966 Broadway revival ===
The show had its second Broadway revival in 1966 at the Music Theater of Lincoln Center. This production opened on May 31, 1966, and ran until July 9, followed by a short 10-week U.S. Tour. It returned to Broadway at the Broadway Theatre on September 21 for 78 performances. Ethel Merman reprised her original role as Annie with Bruce Yarnell as Frank, Benay Venuta as Dolly, and Jerry Orbach as Charles Davenport. The libretto and score were revised: The secondary romance between Tommy Keeler and Winnie Tate was eliminated, including their songs "I'll Share it All With You" and "Who Do You Love, I Hope?", and the song "An Old-Fashioned Wedding" was specially written for the revival and added to the second act. This version of the show is available for licensing for amateur performances. This production was telecast in an abbreviated ninety-minute version by NBC on March 19, 1967, and is the only musical revived at Lincoln Center during the 1960s to be telecast.

=== 1973 Shady Grove Music Fair production ===
Jay Harnick directed a revival at the Shady Grove Music Fair starring Barbara Eden, John Bennett Perry and Sandra Peabody that ran from 1973 to 1974.

=== 1976 Mexican production ===
In 1976 a Spanish-language version was produced in Mexico City with the name of Annie es un tiro. It was directed by José Luis Ibáñez and starred by Mexican film star Silvia Pinal. The production was represented at the Teatro Hidalgo and was co starred by the actor and singer Manuel López Ochoa. The success of the production produced the first Spanish-language version of the musical's soundtrack.

=== 1977 Los Angeles Civic Light Opera production ===
In 1977, Gower Champion directed a revival for the Los Angeles Civic Light Opera starring Debbie Reynolds as Annie. The assistant director was James Mitchell. Harve Presnell, Reynolds's former co-star in the 1964 film The Unsinkable Molly Brown, played Frank Butler. The cast featured Art Lund as Buffalo Bill, Bibi Osterwald as Dolly Tate, Gavin MacLeod as Charlie Davenport, Peter Bruni as Foster Wilson, Don Potter as Pawnee Bill, and Manu Tupou as Sitting Bull. The cast also included Trey Wilson and Debbie Shapiro. The production later toured various North American cities, but never ran on Broadway, its planned destination.

=== 1986 UK tour and London revival ===
In 1986, a David Gilmore Chichester Festival Theatre production, with American rock star Suzi Quatro as Annie and Eric Flynn as Frank, opened at the Chichester Festival Theatre. It moved to the Theatre Royal, Plymouth, and then to the Aldwych Theatre in London's West End where it played from July 29 to October 4. The cast recorded an album, Annie Get Your Gun - 1986 London Cast and Quatro's songs "I Got Lost in His Arms"/"You Can't Get a Man with a Gun" were released as a single. Since then "I Got Lost in His Arms" has also been included in the compilation albums The Divas Collection (2003) and Songs from the Greatest Musicals (2008).

=== 1992 London revival ===
A short-lived London production ran at the Prince of Wales Theatre in the West End, starring Kim Criswell as Annie. Criswell's studio cast recording of the show - made with Thomas Hampson and conductor John McGlinn - provided the impetus for the production. Pippa Ailion was the Casting Director for this production.

=== 1999 Broadway revival ===
In 1999, a new production had its pre-Broadway engagement at the Kennedy Center, Washington, D.C., from December 29, 1998, to January 24, 1999. Previews began on Broadway on February 2, 1999, at the Marquis Theatre, with an official opening on March 4, 1999, and closed on September 1, 2001, after 35 previews and 1,045 performances.

This revival starred Bernadette Peters as Annie and Tom Wopat as Frank, and Ron Holgate as Buffalo Bill, with direction by Graciela Daniele, choreography by Jeff Calhoun, and music arrangements by John McDaniel. Peters won the 1999 Tony Award for Best Leading Actress in a Musical and the production won the Tony for Best Revival of a Musical.

This production had a revised book by Peter Stone and new orchestrations, and was structured as a "show-within-a-show", set as a Big Top travelling circus. "Frank Butler" is alone on stage and Buffalo Bill introduces the main characters, singing "There's No Business Like Show Business", which is reprised when "Annie" agrees to join the traveling Wild West show. The production dropped several songs (including "Colonel Buffalo Bill", "I'm A Bad, Bad Man", and "I'm an Indian Too"), but included "An Old-Fashioned Wedding". There were several major dance numbers added, including a ballroom scene. A sub-plot which had been dropped from the 1966 revival, the romance between Winnie and Tommy, her part-Native-American boyfriend, was also included. In the 1946 production, Winnie was Dolly's daughter, but the 1966 &1999 productions she is Dolly's younger sister. In this version, the final shooting match between Annie and Frank ends in a tie.

==== Notable replacements ====
While Peters was on vacation, All My Children star Susan Lucci made her Broadway debut as Annie from December 27, 1999, until January 16, 2000. Peters and Wopat left the show on September 2, 2000. Former Charlie's Angels star Cheryl Ladd made her Broadway debut as Annie on September 6, 2000, with Patrick Cassidy as Frank Butler. Country music singer Reba McEntire made her Broadway debut as Annie from January 26, 2001, to June 22, 2001, opposite Brent Barrett as Frank. On June 23, 2001, former Wings star Crystal Bernard, who had been playing Annie in the national tour of Annie Get Your Gun, assumed the role of Annie in the Broadway production, with Tom Wopat returning as Frank Butler.

=== 2000 U.S. tour ===
The 1999 Broadway production, in a "slightly revised version", toured in a U.S. national tour starting in Dallas, Texas, on July 25, 2000, with Marilu Henner and Rex Smith. Tom Wopat joined the tour in late October 2000, replacing Smith.

=== 2006 Prince Music Theater production ===
In 2006, the Prince Music Theater of Philadelphia, revived the 1966 Lincoln Center Theater version for one month. This production starred Andrea McArdle (the original Annie of the 1977 Broadway musical Annie), Jeffrey Coon as Frank Butler, John Scherer as Charlie Davenport, Chris Councill as Buffalo Bill, Mary Martello as Dolly Tate, and Arthur Ryan as Sitting Bull. The production was well received by critics. The production was directed by Richard M. Parison Jr. and choreographed by Mercedes Ellington.

=== 2009 London revival ===
Jane Horrocks, Julian Ovenden and director Richard Jones mounted a major London revival at the Young Vic, Waterloo. The show opened at the off West End venue on October 16, 2009, initially booking until January 2, 2010, but with an extra week added due to popular demand. The production featured new arrangements by Jason Carr for a band consisting four pianos. London's Guardian newspaper awarded the show 5 stars, claiming that "Richard Jones's brilliant production offers the wittiest musical staging London has seen in years."

=== 2010 Ravinia Festival concert ===
A concert staging of the original version of Annie Get Your Gun took place at the Ravinia Festival, Chicago from August 13–15, 2010 to celebrate the 150th anniversary of Annie Oakley's birth. Directed by Lonny Price, the concert starred Patti LuPone as Annie, Patrick Cassidy as Frank and George Hearn as Buffalo Bill. The concert received unanimously strong reviews, notably for LuPone and Price's direction.

=== Other major productions ===
Lucie Arnaz starred in a production in the summer of 1978 with Harve Presnell at the Jones Beach Theater in Nassau County, New York. This was the first major production of the musical done in the New York area after the 1966 revival.

The Paper Mill Playhouse produced a well-reviewed production in June 1987 starring Judy Kaye as Annie and Richard White as Frank.

In 2004, Marina Prior and Scott Irwin starred in an Australian production of the 1999 Broadway rewrite of the show.

In 2014 Carter Calvert and David Weitzer starred in a production that opened the Algonquin Arts Theatre's 2014-2015 Broadway Season. It was also the first show to be performed after the Algonquin underwent the task of installing new seating which had not been done since 1938.

In October 2015, a two night concert version was presented at the New York City Center Gala starring Megan Hilty (Annie Oakley) and Andy Karl (Frank Butler). The concerts are directed by John Rando, and the cast features Judy Kaye (Dolly Tate), Ron Raines (Buffalo Bill), Brad Oscar (Charlie) and Chuck Cooper (Pawnee Bill).

In April 2023, a one night concert version was presented at The London Palladium starring Rachel Tucker (Annie Oakley) and Oliver Savile (Frank Butler). The concert was produced by Lambert Jackson Productions, directed by Emma Butler, with musical direction by Adam Hoskins.

== Film and television versions ==
In 1950, Metro Goldwyn Mayer made a well-received movie version of the musical. Although MGM purchased the rights to the film version with an announced intention of starring legendary singer-actress Judy Garland as Annie, early work on the film was plagued with difficulties, some attributed to Garland's health. Garland was fired and replaced by the brassier, blonde Betty Hutton.

In 1957, a production starring Mary Martin as Annie and John Raitt as Frank Butler was broadcast on NBC. In 1967, the Lincoln Center production described above, starring Ethel Merman and Bruce Yarnell, was broadcast on NBC. The Mary Martin version has been re-broadcast sporadically over the years, but the 1967 videotapes starring Ethel Merman have apparently been irretrievably lost. Only a video and audio clip of "I Got the Sun in the Mornin' (and the Moon at Night)" is known to exist, as does an audio-only recording of the entire 90-minute show.

== Recordings ==
There are several recordings of the Annie Get Your Gun score, including:

- 1946 Original Broadway Cast: an original cast recording was released by Decca Records in 1946, featuring the cast of the original 1946 Broadway production. The principal stars were Ethel Merman and Ray Middleton. The album was added to the Grammy Hall of Fame in 1998.
- 1957 TV Cast: a recording based on the TV version shown in 1957, with Mary Martin and John Raitt.
- 1963 Studio Cast featuring Doris Day and Robert Goulet: not based on a theatre production.
- 1966 Broadway Revival Cast
- 1976 Spanish-language version with Mexican cast.
- 1986 1986 London Cast
- 1991 Studio Cast: Kim Criswell (Annie), Thomas Hampson (Frank), Jason Graae (Tommy), Rebecca Luker (Winnie), David Garrison (Charlie), David Healy (Buffalo Bill), Alfred Marks (Sitting Bull), Gregory Jbara (Foster Wilson) Simon Green (Pawnee Bill), Peta Bartlett (Dolly), Kerry Potter, Hayley Spencer, Emma Long (Annie's sisters: Minnie, Jessie Nellie), Paul Keating (Annie's brother: Little Jake), Nick Curtis, Carey Wilson, Michael Pearn (Trainman, Waiter, Porter), Clare Buckfield (Small Girl), John McGlinn (Mac), Bruce Ogston (An Indian), Ambrosian Singers, London Sinfonietta, conducted by John McGlinn. Producer: Simon Woods; Balance Engineer: John Kurlander; Editor Matthew Cocker; Production Assistant: Alison Fox. Recorded July 1990, No 1 Studio, Abbey Road, London. CD: EMI CDC 7 54206 2.
- 1999 Broadway Revival Cast (Grammy Award)

Conductor John Owen Edwards along with JAY Records recorded the first-ever complete recording, with all musical numbers, scene change music and incidental music, of the show's score in the 1990s with Judy Kaye and Barry Bostwick. Christopher Lee had the role of Sitting Bull.

== Reception ==
The original Broadway production opened to favorable reviews. Critics unanimously praised Ethel Merman's performance as Annie Oakley, though some thought the score and book were not particularly distinguished. John Chapman of the New York Daily News declared that the production had "good lyrics and tunes by Irving Berlin...[and] the razzle-dazzle atmosphere of a big-time show" but pronounced Merman the best part of the show, stating "She is a better comedienne than she ever was before", stating that "Annie is a good, standard, lavish, big musical and I'm sure it will be a huge success--but it isn't the greatest show in the world". Louis Kronenberger of PM stated that the show was 'in many ways routine", but greatly praised Merman's performance, opining, "For me, Annie is mainly Miss Merman's show, though the rest of it is competent enough of its kind...Irving Berlin's score is musically not exciting--of the real songs, only one or two are tuneful". Ward Morehouse of The New York Sun declared, "The big news about Annie Get Your Gun is that it reveals Ethel Merman in her best form since Anything Goes...She shouts the Berlin music with good effect. She often comes to the aid of a sagging book". He stated, "Irving Berlin's score is not a notable one, but his tunes are singable and pleasant and his lyrics are particularly good. The book? It's on the flimsy side, definitely. And rather witless too". Lewis Nichols of The New York Times said, "It has a pleasant score by Irving Berlin...and it has Ethel Merman to roll her eyes and to shout down the rafters. The colors are pretty, the dancing is amiable and unaffected, and Broadway by this time is well used to a book which doesn't get anywhere in particular".

However, the show itself was greatly lauded by some critics: Vernon Rice of the New York Post proclaimed, "Irving Berlin has outdone himself this time. No use trying to pick a hit tune, for all the tunes are hits...Ethel Merman is at her lusty, free and easy best...She is now able to develop a consistent characterization and stay with it to the show's end. And when she opens her mouth to sing, she sings!" William Hawkins of the New York World-Telegram said that Merman was "bright as a whip, sure as her shooting, and generously the foremost lady clown of her time" and asserted that the show itself was comparable to those of Rodgers and Hammerstein, proclaiming, "For verve and buoyancy, unslackening, there has seldom if ever been a show like it...the girls in Annie have the beauty and character of looks one associates with a Rodgers and Hammerstein show. And the production has in every way the distinction that has become their hallmark".

Historians have viewed the show as inaccurate, citing among other reasons its portrayal of Annie as a loud, boisterous character, when in reality she had a quiet personality and did needlepoint in her spare time.

=== Native American criticism ===
Some American Indians have criticized the show's portrayal of the Natives and promotion of cultural stereotypes. The song "I'm an Indian Too" is sometimes seen as offensive; Annie sings that song after the character Sitting Bull adopts her into the Sioux tribe. Many contemporary productions have omitted the song from their revivals, both in response to the stereotypes in the lyrics, as well as part of an overall restructuring of the musical for modern audiences.

The Native American comedy group The 1491s used "I'm an Indian Too" in one of their satirical videos posted on YouTube. The video plays with both the reality and the stereotypes of people who identify as Indian.

== Awards and nominations ==
- Mary Martin received a Special Tony Award in 1948 for "Spreading Theatre to the Country While the Originals Perform in New York" (1947-48 US Tour)
- (1947-48 US Tour)

=== 1966 Broadway revival ===
Year	Award Ceremony	Category	Nominee	Result
1966	Tony Award	Best Direction of a Musical	Jack Sydow	Nominated
1966	Tony Award	Best Choreography	Danny Daniels	Nominated

=== 1999 Broadway revival ===
Year	Award Ceremony	Category	Nominee	Result
1999	Tony Award	Best Revival of a Musical		Won
1999	Tony Award	Best Actor in a Musical	Tom Wopat	Nominated
1999	Tony Award	Best Actress in a Musical	Bernadette Peters	Won
1999	Drama Desk Award	Outstanding Revival of a Musical		Nominated
1999	Drama Desk Award	Outstanding Actor in a Musical	Tom Wopat	Nominated
1999	Drama Desk Award	Outstanding Actress in a Musical	Bernadette Peters	Won
1999	Grammy Award	Best Musical Show Album		Won
2001	Drama Desk Award	Special Award	Reba McEntire	Won
2001	Theatre World Award		Reba McEntire	Won

=== 2009 London revival ===
Year	Award Ceremony	Category	Nominee	Result
2009	Laurence Olivier Award	Best Musical Revival		Nominated
