= The Ethel Merman Disco Album =

Studio album by Ethel Merman
- Released: 1979
- Recorded: A&M (Hollywood)
- Genre: Disco
- Label: A&M
- Producer: Peter Matz

The Ethel Merman Disco Album is a 1979 album by American Broadway performer Ethel Merman. It was released on A&M Records. Over the years, the record became a camp classic, with vinyl copies highly sought out by collectors.

== Background ==
Merman recorded 14 songs for The Ethel Merman Disco Album, although only seven were released on the finished record. Each of the songs was recorded in only one take and arranged vocally the way she always recorded them, with disco instrumentation added later as a backtrack.

In 2002, Fynsworth Alley Records acquired the rights to release the album on CD. The CD release contains one bonus track, a recording of "They Say It's Wonderful". There are no plans yet to release the other six tracks.

== Reception ==
Professional ratings
Review scores
Source	Rating
AllMusic	2.5/5 stars

The Globe and Mail panned "the type of mundane, unimaginative disco back-beat that the trendsetters abandoned years ago."

In a retrospective review, William Ruhlmann of music database website AllMusic noted that "everyone, it seemed, was adding a disco beat and trying to cash in on the current – and temporary – fad" and that Merman "was 20 years past her last big success on the Great White Way and, you'd have thought, ready for retirement." He called the album "pretty much like you'd expect. Arranger Peter Matz creates typical disco arrangements - and Merman sings the way she always does, sounding like she has nothing to do with the background at all." Ruhlmann concluded: "The record is really only good for a laugh, but there's just one joke."

== Track listing ==
1. "There's No Business Like Show Business" (Berlin) – 5:48
2. "Everything's Coming Up Roses" (Sondheim, Styne) – 6:30
3. "I Get a Kick Out of You" (Porter) – 6:09
4. "Something for the Boys" (Porter) – 5:19
5. "Some People" (Sondheim, Styne) – 4:49
6. "Alexander's Ragtime Band" (Berlin) – 4:28
7. "I Got Rhythm" (Gershwin, Gershwin) – 5:06
8. "They Say It's Wonderful" (Berlin) (bonus track on CD reissue)

== Personnel ==
- Ethel Merman – vocals
- Chuck Berghofer, Greg Lee – bass
- Dennis Budimir, Mitch Holder, Michael Anthony – guitars
- John Berkman, Peter Matz – keyboards
- Steve Schaeffer – drums
- Paulinho da Costa, Garyno – percussion
- Ernie Watts, Bud Shank – saxophone solos
- Bobby Borelli, Jon Joyce, George Ferren, Steve Smith, Manny Slali, Jon Randazzo – background vocals
- Stephanie Spruill, Marilyn Jackson – background vocal directors

== See also ==
- Golden Throats
