= Benay Venuta =

American actress (1910–1995)

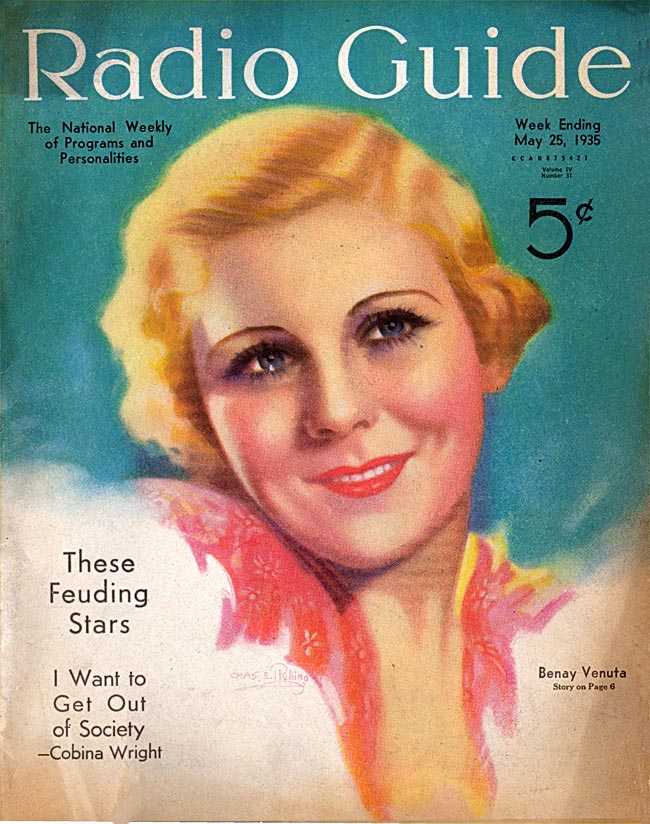
- Venuta by Charles E. Rubino, in 1935
- Born: Benvenuta Rose Crooke; January 27, 1910; San Francisco, California, U.S.
- Died: September 1, 1995 (aged 85); New York City, New York, U.S.
- Occupation: Actress
- Years active: 1928–1994
- Spouses: Kenneth Kelley (m. 1935; div. 1939) Armand Deutsch (m. 1939; div. 1950) Fred Clark (m. 1952; div. 1962)
- Children: 2

Benay Venuta (born Benvenuta Rose Crooke; January 27, 1910 – September 1, 1995) was an American actress, singer and dancer. She is best known for her work in the mid and late 1930s, in which she parlayed her success on Broadway into star treatment on network radio. After World War II, she developed an enduring career as a supporting actress in musicals on stage and in Hollywood, interspersed with work on television.

== Early life ==
Venuta was born Benvenuta Rose Crooke in San Francisco to an English father and Swiss-Italian mother. A graduate of Hollywood High School in Los Angeles, she learned French and German before she dropped out of a finishing school in Geneva, after which she lived in London where she worked as a dancer before returning to the United States in 1929. "My father was dead," she said, "and I had to go to work" because her family had no money.

== Film ==
Venuta made her first screen appearance in the silent Trail of '98 in 1928. She also appeared in Repeat Performance (1947), Annie Get Your Gun (1950, as Dolly Tate), Call Me Mister (1951), The Fuzzy Pink Nightgown (1957), and Bullets Over Broadway (1994).

The finale of Call Me Mister is a production number of "Love is Back in Business" staged by Busby Berkeley, ending with four leading players on a precarious, high-rising disc surrounded by water fountains. Venuta is replaced here by a lookalike in the same clothes. Asked in the 1970s about this, she explained: "Betty Grable said, ‘I’m the star. I gotta do it.’ Dan Dailey was so drunk he didn’t care what he was doing. Danny Thomas said, ‘I’m on the way up. I gotta do it.’ Well, I didn’t gotta do it."

== Stage ==
Venuta made her Broadway debut when she replaced Ethel Merman in the lead role of Reno Sweeney in Cole Porter's Anything Goes in 1935. The two remained close friends and co-starred in a revival of Annie Get Your Gun in 1966. Additional Broadway credits included By Jupiter (1942), Hazel Flagg (1953), and Romantic Comedy (1979).

Venuta's summer stock and regional theatre credits included A Little Night Music, Bus Stop, Gypsy, Come Blow Your Horn, Auntie Mame, The Prisoner of Second Avenue, Little Me, and Pal Joey.

== Television ==
In 1958, Venuta was cast as private eye Bertha Cool in a television pilot for a series to be called Cool and Lam, based on the novels by Erle Stanley Gardner writing as A. A. Fair, but the pilot remains the only episode in existence.

Television audiences knew her as Jean Smart's prim and proper mother-in-law Ellen Stillfield in the sitcom Designing Women.

She also appeared on That Girl in a 1968 episode titled, "The Seventh Time Around," as Lady Margaret "Trixie" Weatherby.

== Radio ==
Venuta's Benay Venuta Hour "was a popular CBS radio program." She was a vocalist on such shows as Freddie Rich's Penthouse Party, Duffy's Tavern and Take a Note. In 1948, she was the host of Keep Up with the Kids, a Mutual radio quiz show in which celebrity parents (Roddy McDowall, Penny Singleton, Pat O'Brien) competed against their children.

== Personal life ==
Venuta married Kenneth Kelley on October 20, 1935, in Ossining, New York. They were divorced on November 29, 1939. She next married film producer Armand Deutsch; the couple had two daughters, Patty and Deborah. They separated in June 1950, and she sued for divorce two weeks later. She was married to character actor Fred Clark from 1952 to 1962.

== Death ==
Venuta died from lung cancer in New York City on September 1, 1995, at age 85.

Several sources have given her birthdate as January 27, 1911. In her obituary, published in The New York Times, her birthdate is listed as 1911, indicating she died at age 84. However, both the California Birth Index and the United States Census show her birth at 1910, which would make her 85 in 1995, at the time of her death.
