= They Say It's Wonderful =

1946 popular song written by Irving Berlin

Single by Ethel Merman and Ray Middleton

from the album Annie Get Your Gun
- B-side: "Anything You Can Do"
- Released: May 16, 1946
- Genre: show tune
- Length: 3:06
- Label: Brunswick
- Songwriter: Irving Berlin

"They Say It's Wonderful" is a popular song written by Irving Berlin for the musical Annie Get Your Gun (1946), where it was introduced by Ethel Merman and Ray Middleton. A film version in 1950 again featured the song when it was performed by Howard Keel and Betty Hutton.

== Recordings ==
- Ethel Merman recorded it for the original Decca Records cast album of Annie Get Your Gun (1946). In 1979, she recorded a "camp" version for The Ethel Merman Disco Album, but it was not released on the original vinyl record. It was issued as a bonus track on the CD reissue in 2002.
- Andy Russell – single (1946; Billboard No. 10)
- Perry Como with Russ Case and His Orchestra – single (1946; Billboard No. 27)
- Bing Crosby recorded the song on January 22, 1946 - single (1946; Billboard No. 12)
- Frank Sinatra – single (1946; "Billboard" No. 11)
- Modern Jazz Quartet – The Modern Jazz Quartet (1957)
- Dave Brubeck – Plays and Plays and... (1957)
- Sarah Vaughan – Sarah Vaughan Sings Broadway: Great Songs from Hit Shows (1958)
- Johnny Mathis – Heavenly (1959)
- Doris Day – Show Time (1960)
- John Coltrane & Johnny Hartman - John Coltrane and Johnny Hartman (1963)
- Jimmy Scott – Falling in Love Is Wonderful (1963)
- Suzi Quatro & Eric Flynn – Annie Get Your Gun – 1986 London Cast (1986)
- Tony Bennett – Bennett/Berlin (1987)
- Stacey Kent – Love Is...The Tender Trap (1998)
- Eliane Elias – Everything I Love (2000)
- Judy Garland & Howard Keel recorded the song when Garland was originally slated to star in the film. It was released on the Annie Get Your Gun film soundtrack reissue CD (2000).
- Todd Murray – When I Sing Low (2002)

== Popular culture ==
- More recently it was performed in an episode of The Marvelous Mrs. Maisel by Darius de Haas.
