= Todd Murray =

American cabaret singer and songwriter

Todd Murray is an American cabaret singer and songwriter known for his rich baritone voice and sophisticated interpretations of jazz, swing, and American standards. Born on April 18, in Lewisburg, Pennsylvania, he grew up in the small town of Montandon. Murray graduated from Susquehanna University with a Bachelor of Arts degree in music and business.

Early in his career, Murray was involved in theater productions at the Paper Mill Playhouse and the South Coast Repertory. He starred in an Off-Broadway production of Gilbert and Sullivan's "The Gondoliers" and joined the touring production of the Broadway musical "The Secret Garden." Transitioning to nightclub and cabaret settings, he built a solid reputation as a crooner, performing nationally and internationally with critical acclaim.

Murray has released several critically acclaimed albums, including "When I Sing Low" (2002), "Stardust and Swing" (2008), and "Croon." His music showcases his ability to swing at every tempo and deliver romantic ballads with sincerity. He has been praised for his "trembling sensitivity" and is often called "the songwriter's dream." In 2018 Murray released two self-penned popular Christmas songs with a long version and edited version: "Let's Hear It For Santa Claus" and "Let's Here It For Santa (edited version), and "I'm Gettin' Into The Swing of Christmas" and "The Swing of Christmas (edited version.) The former is heard on Hallmark's television movie "Christmas at Dollywood."

Mr. Murray is also an accomplished song writer. "And I'm Leaving Today," "The Girl From Waco," "When I Sing Low," "Patricia," along with his Christmas tunes are all professionally released with full orchestra. Many of his recordings were arranged and conducted by the infamous Dennis McCarthy at Capital Records Studio A.

Murray created and operated a commercial bakery in Los Angeles with major clients such as Starbucks, Trader Joes, and Whole Foods called Oliver's Bäckerei which he successfully sold in 2004. He also co directed with Will Wyatt and produced a WWII era documentary "Toni and Rosi" about two pianist sister that were able to escape the war. I aired on the BBC and won numerous movie festival awards.

In addition to his recordings, Murray has performed at prestigious venues such as Lincoln Center's Rose Hall and New York's Town Hall, and "The Musical Romance of Frank Sinatra and Peggy Lee with co-star Stacy Sullivan" played at Carnegie Hall. He has also been a featured performer in the Broadway By the Year series. His cabaret shows, including "CROON" and "Stardust and Swing," have garnered much praise, with "CROON" receiving "Best Male Cabaret Show" and "Best Male Vocalist" by BroadwayWorld.com.

Murray's music style is deeply rooted in the traditions of classic American crooners, delivering timeless songs with a modern sensibility. His performances are characterized by a smooth, strong, and warm voice that immediately sets the audience at ease, allowing his rich sound to wash over them.

Murray currently resides in Los Angeles and Maine.
