= You Can't Get a Man with a Gun =

Song from the musical Annie Get Your Gun

Song by Ethel Merman

from the album Annie Get Your Gun (musical)
- Released: 1946
- Genre: Pop standard; Show tune
- Length: 3:13
- Songwriter: Irving Berlin

"You Can't Get a Man with a Gun" is a song from the 1946 musical Annie Get Your Gun, written by Irving Berlin. It was originally performed by Ethel Merman.

== Background ==
In the song, Annie Oakley sings about how a girl with talent as a sharpshooter nevertheless finds that her abilities do not help her attract men. She introduces herself with: "I'm quick on the trigger/with targets not much bigger/than a pinpoint I'm number one." The song is humorous in that she imagines different scenarios in which shooting a man will not make him fall in love with her, e.g. "A man may be hot/but he's not/when he's shot/oh, you can't get a man with a gun!" and "But you can't shoot a lover,/and use him for a cover/oh, you can't get a man with a gun!"

== Recordings ==
- Doris Day - for her album Annie Get Your Gun (1963)
- Eydie Gormé - for her album Gormé Sings Showstoppers (1959).
- Betty Hutton - included in the album Annie Get Your Gun (Original Soundtrack) (1950).
- Ethel Merman - included in Annie Get Your Gun [Original Cast Album] (1946).
- Bernadette Peters - included in Annie Get Your Gun [1999 Broadway Revival Cast] (1999).
- Suzi Quatro – starred as Annie Oakley in the 1986 West End (London) production of Annie Get Your Gun. She sings the song in the album Annie Get Your Gun – 1986 London Cast (1986), and the associated single "I Got Lost in His Arms" (1986).
