= Moonshine Lullaby =

1946 show tune from "Annie Get Your Gun"

"Moonshine Lullaby" is a song from the 1946 musical Annie Get Your Gun, by Irving Berlin. It was first performed by Ethel Merman. (It was not used in the 1950 film version.) Other singers to have recorded the song include Bernadette Peters in 1999, Doris Day, and Mary Martin in 1957. The song itself is considered a lullaby, but the lyrics are about a still where moonshine is brewed illegally.
