= I'm an Indian Too =

1946 song

"I'm an Indian Too" is a song from the 1946 musical Annie Get Your Gun, by Irving Berlin. It was originally performed by Ethel Merman. It is sung by the main character Annie after Sitting Bull adopts her into the Sioux tribe.

It is typical of mid-20th-century views of Native Americans, and is sometimes considered racist and demeaning from a contemporary perspective, although others see it as a mildly satirical attack on racial stereotyping. Native Americans did protest outside the New York theatre, as well as movie theaters, holding picket signs stating: "Don't See 'Annie Get Your Gun'". Many contemporary productions have omitted the song from their revivals, both in response to the stereotypes in the lyrics, as well as part of an overall restructuring of the musical for modern audience.

In 1979, the song was remixed and released as a dance track by disco artist Don Armando.

Other singers to have recorded the song include Doris Day (for the 1963 album Annie Get Your Gun), Judy Garland, and Betty Hutton.
