= The Girl That I Marry =

1946 song by Irving Berlin

"The Girl That I Marry" is a song from the 1946 musical Annie Get Your Gun, written by Irving Berlin.

It was originally performed by Ray Middleton on stage and on record.

== 1946 recordings ==
Hit versions in 1946 were by Frank Sinatra and by Eddy Howard (Majestic label).

== Other recordings ==
Later renditions include:

- Per Grundén with orchestra Conductor: Hans Schreiber. Swedish lyrics written by Stig Bergendorff and Gösta Bernhard entitled "Den flickan skall bära mitt efternamn". Recorded in Stockholm on August 19, 1949, and released on the 78 rpm record His Master's Voice X 7540
- Howard Keel in the 1950 MGM film of Annie Get Your Gun, also released on record.
- Bruce Yarnell in the 1966 production at Lincoln Centre, with Ethel Merman, recorded on RCA Records.
- Eddy Howard recorded a second rendition in the early 1950s on the Mercury label. Though released on The Best Of Eddy Howard - The Mercury Years (1996)
- Tom Wopat on the 1999 Broadway revival recording.
