= Eric Flynn =

British actor (1939–2002)

- Born: Eric William Flynn; 13 December 1939; Hainan Island, Republic of China (1912–1949)
- Died: 4 March 2002 (aged 62); Pembrokeshire, Wales
- Occupation: Actor
- Years active: 1960–2002
- Spouses: Fern Flynn (m. 1959–1980) Caroline Forbes (m. 1981)
- Children: 5, including Daniel, Jerome and Johnny

Eric William Flynn (13 December 1939 – 4 March 2002) was a British actor.

== Early life ==
Flynn was born on 13 December 1939 on Hainan Island, Republic of China (1912–1949), where his father was a customs officer for the Hong Kong government. After the outbreak of war and the Japanese invasion of China, his family spent several years interned in a Japanese prisoner of war camp (50 years later he would play a British prisoner in the film Empire of the Sun, set in a Japanese prison of war camp in China).

He returned to Britain at the age of 13, and was educated at Chatham House School in Ramsgate. He then gained a scholarship to Royal Academy of Dramatic Art (RADA), where he met his first wife Fern.

== Career ==
Flynn had many television roles. He appeared as Alan-A-Dale in A Challenge for Robin Hood in 1967, as Germanicus Caesar in the ITV historical drama series, The Caesars, as Leo Ryan in the Doctor Who story "The Wheel in Space" in 1968, as Ivanhoe in a 1970 TV mini-series, as Major Tom Graham in series five of Freewheelers in 1971 and as Slattery in one episode of Thriller ('A Killer In Every Corner'), in 1975.

He was also an established musical theatre actor appearing in shows such as Evita, Chess, Annie Get Your Gun, The Sound Of Music, My Fair Lady, A Little Night Music, and Copacabana, playing alongside the likes of Lauren Bacall, Maria Freidman, and Suzi Quatro. He played the role of Bobby during part of the 1972 London production of Stephen Sondheim's Company.

== Personal life ==
Flynn's sons by his first marriage, Daniel and Jerome, are both actors. He also had a daughter, Kerry, by his first marriage. Flynn married his second wife Caroline, a South African, in 1981. His daughter from his second marriage, Lillie Flynn, finished a three-year acting degree at The Central School of Speech and Drama in 2007 and his son, Johnny, is also an actor and singer.

== Death ==
Eric Flynn died of cancer at his home in Pembrokeshire, Wales, on 4 March 2002, aged 62.

== Filmography ==
| Year | Title | Role | Notes |
|---|---|---|---|
| 1960 | Exodus | Bit Part | Uncredited |
| 1962 | The Silent Invasion | Erik von Strafen | |
| 1963 | Dr. Syn, Alias the Scarecrow | Lt. Philip Brackenbury | |
| 1965 | Mr. Brown Comes Down the Hill | Mr. Brown | |
| 1967 | A Challenge for Robin Hood | Alan-a-Dale | |
| 1980 | Safari 3000 | Rally Team Interviewer | |
| 1985 | Deadly Passion | Robert Chandler | |
| 1987 | Empire of the Sun | British Prisoner No. 1 | |
| 1988 | The Zero Option | Col. Patrick Ansell | |
