= Anything You Can Do (I Can Do Better) =

1946 song from the musical Annie Get Your Gun

"They Say It's Wonderful"

Single by Ethel Merman and Ray Middleton

from the album Annie Get Your Gun
- A-side: "They Say It's Wonderful"
- Released: May 16, 1946
- Genre: show tune
- Length: 3:10
- Label: Brunswick
- Songwriter: Irving Berlin

"Anything You Can Do (I Can Do Better)" is a show tune composed by Irving Berlin for the 1946 Broadway musical Annie Get Your Gun. The song is a duet, with one male singer and one female singer attempting to outdo each other in increasingly complex tasks.

In the musical, the song sets the scene for the climactic sharpshooting contest between Annie Oakley and Frank Butler. Its most memorable lines are, "Anything you can do, I can do better; I can do anything better than you." The song was first performed in Annie Get Your Gun by Ethel Merman and Ray Middleton.

During the song, they argue playfully about who can, for example, speak softer, sing higher, sing sweeter, and hold a note for longer, and boast of their abilities and accomplishments, such as opening safes and living on bread and cheese, although Annie almost always seems to counter Frank's argument. Neither can "bake a pie," though.

== Notable versions ==
- Ethel Merman and Ray Middleton from original cast recording (1946).
- Bing Crosby, Dick Haymes and The Andrews Sisters—recorded for Decca Records on March 19, 1947.
- Betty Hutton and Howard Keel in the 1950 film version of the musical
- Mary Martin and John Raitt on the 1957 National Tour recording
- Doris Day and Robert Goulet for the Columbia Records album Annie Get Your Gun (1963)
- In 1963, Heidi Brühl and Robert Trehy performed a German version in the stage version of this musical at the Theater des Westens in Berlin.
- Dusty Springfield and Freddie Paris on the Australian Bandstand TV programme in 1967.
- Robert Morse and an office computer in 1968 TV series That's Life, episode S1E11 "Bobby's Pink Slip"
- Two dogs in The Goodies episode "Kitten Kong" (1971).
- Michael Jordan and Mia Hamm, Gatorade "Michael vs. Mia" commercial (1999), performed by Sophia Ramos
- Laura Osnes and Jeremy Jordan live at Cafe Carlyle in 2012.

== Other recorded versions ==
- Ethel Merman and Neilson Taylor (1973)
- Judy Garland and Howard Keel (Pre-Production of film Annie Get Your Gun)
- The Majors
- Von Trapp Children (song is on their Live in Concert DVD)
- Jim McNaught (1964)

== Variants ==
- Peter Tosh: "I'm the Toughest"
- Neil Patrick Harris and Hugh Jackman: Live performance, 2011 Tony Awards
