= I Got Lost in His Arms =

1946 song by Irving Berlin

"I Got Lost in His Arms" is a song from the 1946 musical Annie Get Your Gun, written by Irving Berlin. It was performed by Ethel Merman in the original production of the musical.

== Background ==
In the torch song, Annie Oakley sings about the sensation of falling in love with Frank Butler. The ballad has a lot of repeated notes too.

== Recordings ==
- Julie London – Julie Is Her Name, Volume II (1958)
- Suzi Quatro – starred as Annie Oakley in the 1986 West End (London) production of Annie Get Your Gun; she sings the song on the album Annie Get Your Gun - 1986 London Cast (1986), the associated single "I Got Lost in His Arms" (1986), plus the compilation albums The Divas Collection (2003) and Songs from the Greatest Musicals (2008).
- Liza Minnelli – Gently (1996)
- Stacey Kent - The Lyric (with Jim Tomlinson) (2005)
