= I Got the Sun in the Mornin' (and the Moon at Night) =

English language song

"I Got the Sun in the Mornin' (and the Moon at Night)" is a song from the 1946 musical Annie Get Your Gun, written by Irving Berlin and originally performed by Ethel Merman. Hit recordings in 1946 were by Les Brown (vocal by Doris Day) (No. 10 in the Billboard charts) and by Artie Shaw (vocal by Mel Torme) (No. 17).

Stig Bergendorff and Gösta Bernhard wrote the Swedish lyrics betitled "Jag har solen och månen". Per Grundén with Orchestra Conductor: Hans Schreiber recorded it in Stockholm on August 19, 1949. It was released on the 78 rpm record His Master's Voice X 7540.

== Other recordings ==
Other singers to have recorded the song include Doris Day, Betty Hutton (in the 1950 movie version of Annie Get Your Gun), Bernadette Peters, Judy Garland, Dean Martin and June Christy with the Stan Kenton Orchestra.

== Popular culture ==
- In the Hawaii Five-0 episode, "Hau'oli La Ho'omaika'i," first aired on November 22, 2013, guest star Carol Burnett ends the show by singing the song.
