= Ethel Merman =

American actress and singer (1908–1984)

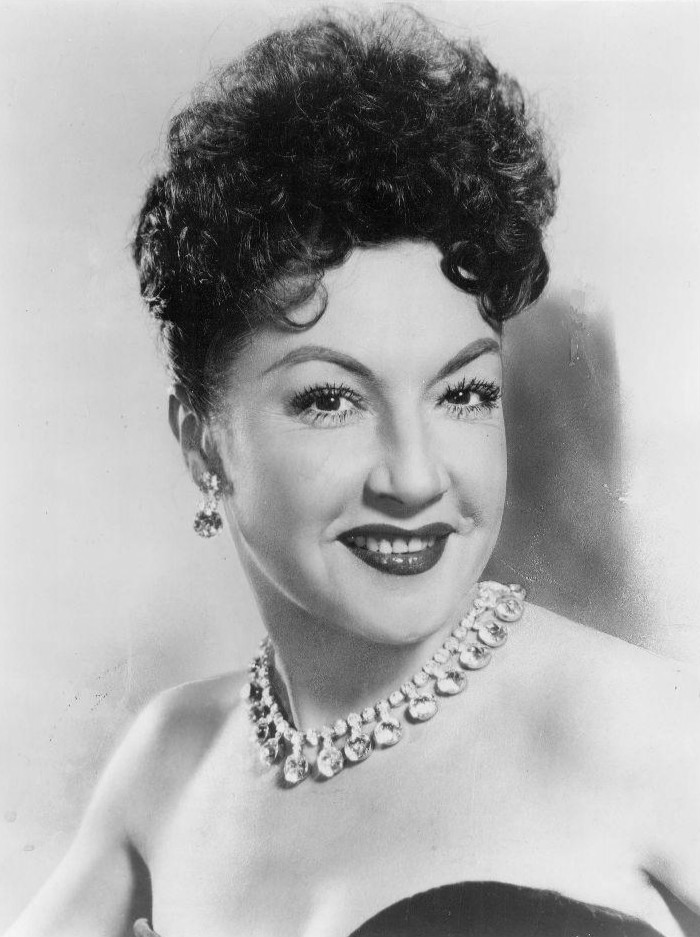
- Merman in 1956
- Born: Ethel Agnes Zimmermann; January 16, 1908; Queens, New York City, U.S.
- Died: February 15, 1984 (aged 76); Manhattan, New York City, U.S.
- Resting place: Shrine of Remembrance Mausoleum, Colorado Springs, Colorado, U.S.
- Occupations: Actress; singer
- Years active: 1930–1983
- Political party: Republican
- Spouses: William Smith (m. 1940; div. 1941) Robert Levitt, Sr. (m. 1941; div. 1952) Robert Six (m. 1953; div. 1960) Ernest Borgnine (m. 1964; div. 1964)
- Children: 2
- Relatives: Barbara Colby, daughter-in-law
- Awards: American Theater Hall of Fame; Hollywood Walk of Fame

Ethel Merman (born Ethel Agnes Zimmermann; January 16, 1908 – February 15, 1984) was an American singer and actress. Known for her distinctive, powerful voice, and her leading roles in musical theater, she has been called "the undisputed First Lady of the musical comedy stage." Variety claimed that she probably starred in more hit musicals than any other performer on Broadway – having starred in Girl Crazy, Du Barry Was a Lady, Panama Hattie, Anything Goes, Annie Get Your Gun, Call Me Madam and Gypsy. They also called her "one of the tiny handful of Broadway stars who had the talent, vitality, personality and drive to carry a show to critical and boxoffice success on her own." Among many accolades, she received the Tony Award for Best Actress in a Musical for her performance in Call Me Madam, a Grammy Award for the Gypsy original Broadway cast album, and a Drama Desk Award for Hello, Dolly!

Merman introduced many Broadway standards, including "I Got Rhythm" from Girl Crazy, "Rose's Turn" from Gypsy, and the Cole Porter songs "It's De-Lovely" (from Red, Hot and Blue), and "I Get a Kick Out of You", "You're the Top", and "Anything Goes" (from Anything Goes). The Irving Berlin song "There's No Business Like Show Business", written for Annie Get Your Gun, became Merman's signature song.

She is also known for her film roles in Anything Goes (1936), Call Me Madam (1953), There's No Business Like Show Business (1954), and It's a Mad, Mad, Mad, Mad World (1963).

== Early life ==
Ethel Merman was born January 16, 1908, in her maternal grandmother's house in Astoria, Queens, but she later insisted that the year of her birth was 1912. She was an only child. Her father, Edward Zimmermann, was an accountant with James H. Dunham & Company, a Manhattan wholesale dry-goods company, and her mother, Agnes (née Gardner) Zimmermann, was a schoolteacher.

Edward had been raised in the Dutch Reformed Church and Agnes was Presbyterian. Shortly after they married, they joined the Episcopal congregation at Church of the Redeemer, where their daughter was baptized. Merman's parents were strict about church attendance and she spent every Sunday attending morning services, Sunday school, afternoon prayer meetings, and evening study groups for children.

Merman's parents insisted she have an education with training in secretarial skills, in case her entertainment career failed. Merman attended P.S. 4 and William Cullen Bryant High School (which later named its auditorium in her honor), where she pursued a commercial course that offered secretarial training. She was active in numerous extracurricular activities, including the school magazine, the speakers' club, and student council, and frequented the local music store to peruse the weekly arrivals of new sheet music.

On Friday nights, the Zimmermann family took the subway into Manhattan to see the vaudeville show at the Palace Theatre, where Merman saw Blossom Seeley, Fanny Brice, Sophie Tucker, and Nora Bayes. At home, she tried to emulate their singing styles, but found her own distinctive voice difficult to disguise.

After graduating from Bryant High School in 1924, Merman was hired as a stenographer by the Boyce-Ite Company. One day during her lunch break, she met Vic Kliesrath, who offered her a job at the Bragg-Kliesrath Corporation for a $5 increase above the weekly $23 salary she was earning, and Merman accepted the offer. She eventually became personal secretary to company president Caleb Bragg, whose frequent lengthy absences from the office to race automobiles allowed her to catch up on the sleep she had lost the previous night when she was out late singing at private parties.

During this period, Merman began performing in nightclubs, first hired by Jimmy Durante's partner Lou Clayton. At this time, she decided the name Ethel Zimmermann was too long for a theater marquee, her next ambition to sing in. She considered combining Ethel with Gardner or Hunter, which was her grandmother's maiden name. Her father strongly disapproved of these considerations, so she abbreviated Zimmermann to Merman to appease him.

== Career ==
=== Early career ===
During a two-week singing engagement at a club in midtown Manhattan called Little Russia, Merman met agent Lou Irwin, who arranged for her to audition for Archie Mayo, a film director under contract at Warner Bros. He offered her an exclusive six-month contract, starting at $125 per week, and Merman quit her day job, only to find herself idle for weeks while waiting to be cast in a film. She urged Irwin to cancel her agreement with Mayo; instead, he negotiated her a better deal allowing her to perform in clubs while remaining on the Warner Bros.'s payroll. Merman was hired as a torch singer at Les Ambassadeurs, where the headliner was Jimmy Durante; the two became lifelong friends. She worked with Durante with his trio of Clayton, Jackson and Durante. She caught the attention of columnists such as Walter Winchell and Mark Hellinger, who began to give her publicity. Soon after, Merman underwent a tonsillectomy, which she feared would damage her voice, but after recovering, she discovered it was more powerful than ever.

While singing in vaudevillian revues on the Keith Circuit, Merman was signed to replace Ruth Etting in the Paramount film Follow the Leader (1930), starring Ed Wynn and Ginger Rogers. Following a successful seven-week run at the Brooklyn Paramount, she was signed to perform at the Palace for $500 per week. During the run, theater producer Vinton Freedley saw her sing and invited her to audition for the role of San Francisco café singer Kate Fothergill in his new musical by George and Ira Gershwin, Girl Crazy. Upon hearing her sing "I Got Rhythm", the Gershwins immediately cast her, and Merman began balancing daytime rehearsals with her matinee and evening performance schedule at the Palace.

Girl Crazy opened on October 14, 1930, at the Alvin Theatre, where it ran for 272 performances. The New York Times noted Merman sang "with dash, authority, good voice and just the right knowing style", and The New Yorker called her "imitative of no one." Merman was indifferent to her reviews, prompting George Gershwin to ask her mother: "Have you ever seen a person so unconcerned as Ethel?" Her memorable, showstopping, performance of "I Got Rhythm" made her an instant star. She held a high note in the song for a full second chorus. Merman also introduced the songs "Sam and Delilah" and "Boy! What Love Has Done to Me!" in the show.

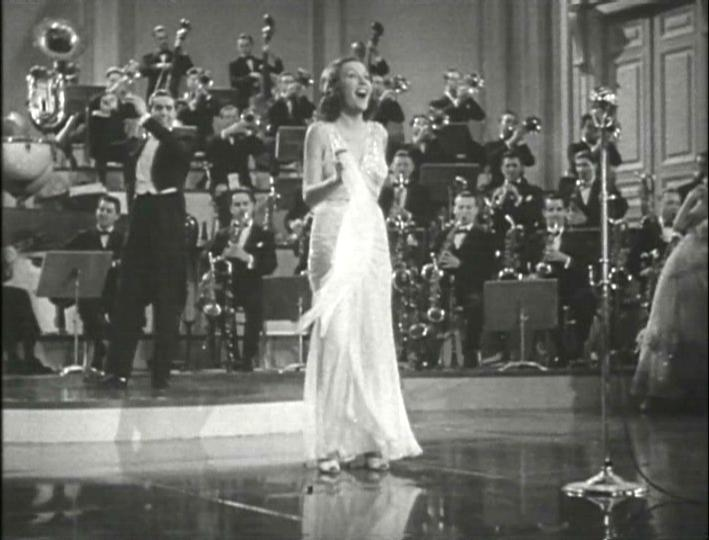
Merman with Tyrone Power in the trailer for Alexander's Ragtime Band (1938)

During the run of Girl Crazy, Paramount signed Merman to appear in a series of 10 short musical films, most of which allowed her to sing both a rousing number and a ballad. She also sang at the Central Park Casino, the Paramount Theatre, and a return engagement at the Palace. As soon as Girl Crazy closed, she departed with her parents for a vacation in Lake George in upstate New York, but after their first day there, Merman was summoned to Atlantic City, New Jersey, to help salvage the troubled latest edition of George White's Scandals. Because she was still under contract to Freedley, White was forced to pay the producer $10,000 for her services, in addition to her weekly $1,500 salary. Following the Atlantic City run, the show played in Newark, New Jersey, and then Brooklyn before opening on Broadway, where it ran for 202 performances.

Merman's next show, Humpty Dumpty, began rehearsals in August 1932 and opened—and immediately closed—in Pittsburgh the following month. Producer Buddy DeSylva, who also had written the book and lyrics, was certain it could be reworked into a success, and with a revamped script and additional songs by Vincent Youmans, it opened with the new title Take a Chance on November 26 at the 42nd Street Apollo Theatre, where it ran for 243 performances. Brooks Atkinson of The New York Times called it "fast, loud, and funny" and added Merman "has never loosed herself with quite so much abandon." Following the Broadway run, she agreed to join the show on the road, but shortly after the Chicago opening, she claimed the chlorine in the city's water supply was irritating her throat, and returned to Manhattan.

Merman returned to Hollywood to appear in We're Not Dressing (1934), a screwball comedy based on the J. M. Barrie play The Admirable Crichton. Despite working with a cast including Bing Crosby, Carole Lombard, and Burns and Allen, under the direction of Academy Award-winning director Norman Taurog, Merman was unhappy with the experience, and she was dismayed to discover one of her musical numbers had been cut when she attended the New York opening with her family and friends. She also appeared on screen with Eddie Cantor in Kid Millions (also 1934), but her return to Broadway established her as a major star and cemented her image as a tough girl.

=== Collaboration with Cole Porter ===
Anything Goes was the first of five Cole Porter musicals in which Merman starred. Like Girl Crazy, it was produced by Freedly and Alex Aarons. In addition to the title song, Merman also sang "I Get a Kick Out of You", "You're the Top", and "Blow Gabriel Blow". It opened on November 21, 1934, at the Alvin Theatre, and the New York Post called Merman "vivacious and ingratiating in her comedy moments, and the embodiment of poise and technical adroitness" when singing "as only she knows how to do." Although Merman always had remained with a show until the end of its run, she left Anything Goes after eight months to appear with Eddie Cantor in the film Strike Me Pink (1936). She was replaced by Benay Venuta, with whom she enjoyed a long but frequently tempestuous friendship.

Merman initially was overlooked for the film version of Anything Goes (1936). Bing Crosby insisted his wife Dixie Lee be cast as Reno Sweeney opposite his role as Billy Crocker, but when she unexpectedly dropped out of the project, Merman got the part. From the beginning, it was clear to Merman the film would not be the enjoyable experience she had hoped it would be. The focus was shifted to Crosby, leaving her in a supporting role. Many of Porter's ribald lyrics were altered to conform to the guidelines of the Motion Picture Production Code, and "Blow Gabriel Blow" was eliminated, replaced by a song, "Shang Hai-de-Ho", which Merman was forced to perform in a headdress made of peacock feathers while surrounded by dancers dressed as Chinese slave girls. The film was completed $201,000 over budget and 17 days behind schedule. Richard Watts Jr. of the New York Herald Tribune described it as "dull and commonplace", stating that Merman did "as well as possible", but she was unable to register "on screen as magnificently as she does on stage."

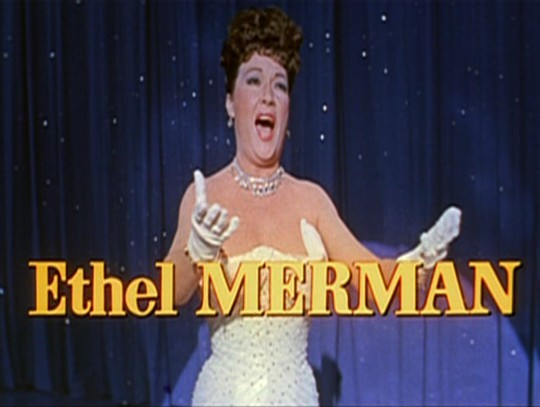
In the film trailer for There's No Business Like Show Business (1954)

Merman returned to Broadway for another Porter musical (again produced by Freedly and Aarons), but despite the presence of Jimmy Durante and Bob Hope in the cast, Red, Hot and Blue closed after less than six months. The score included "Down in the Depths (On the Ninetieth Floor)", "Ridin' High" and "It's De-Lovely". Back in Hollywood, Merman was featured in Happy Landing, one of the top-10 box-office hits of 1938 comedy with Sonja Henie, Cesar Romero, and Don Ameche. She also starred in the box-office hit Alexander's Ragtime Band, a pastiche of Irving Berlin songs interpolated into a plot that vaguely paralleled the composer's life, and Straight, Place and Show, a critical and commercial flop starring the Ritz Brothers. She returned to the stage with Durante in Stars in Your Eyes with songs by Dorothy Fields and Arthur Schwartz, but it closed short of four months of its opening and after only 127 performances as the public flocked to the 1939 New York World's Fair. Merman followed this with two more Porter musicals. Du Barry Was a Lady, with Bert Lahr and Betty Grable, ran for a year, and Panama Hattie, with Betty Hutton (whose musical numbers were cut from the show on opening night at Merman's insistence), June Allyson, and Arthur Treacher, fared even better, lasting slightly more than 14 months and 501 performances.

Shortly after the opening of the latter, Merman—still despondent about the end of her affair with Stork Club owner Sherman Billingsley—married her first husband, William Smith, Treacher's agent. She later said she knew on their wedding night that she had made "a dreadful mistake", and two months later, she filed for divorce on grounds of desertion. Shortly after, she met and married Robert D. Levitt, a promotion director for the New York Journal-American. The couple eventually had two children and divorced in 1952 due to Levitt's excessive drinking and erratic behavior.

In 1943, Merman was a featured performer in the film Stage Door Canteen and opened in another Porter musical, Something for the Boys, produced by Michael Todd. In 1944, she was set to star as the title character in the musical play Sadie Thompson with a score by Vernon Duke and Howard Dietz, directed and produced by Rouben Mamoulian. The musical play was based on the short story "Rain" by W. Somerset Maugham. The serious nature of the production was a departure from Merman's string of successful musical comedies. During rehearsals, Merman had difficulties memorizing the lyrics, and she blamed Dietz for his use of sophisticated and foreign words. She had her husband tone down some of the lyrics. Dietz took exception to Merman's singing the altered lyrics and gave her an ultimatum to sing his original lyrics or leave the show. In response, Merman withdrew from the production. Commentators have speculated that Merman's departure was probably due to her reluctance to assume such a serious role in her first dramatic musical. June Havoc left her starring role in Mexican Hayride and assumed the role, instead. Sadie Thompson opened on Broadway on November 16, 1944, to mixed reviews. Havoc received almost uniformly favorable reviews. Reactions to the score and the book were mixed, with the score called "undistinguished." The show only lasted 60 performances and closed on January 6, 1945.

=== Collaboration with Irving Berlin ===
In August 1945, while in the hospital recovering from the caesarean birth of her second child, Merman was visited by Fields, who proposed she star as Annie Oakley in a musical her brother Herbert and she were writing with Jerome Kern. Merman accepted, but in November, Kern suffered a stroke while in New York City visiting Richard Rodgers and Oscar Hammerstein (the producers of the show) and died a few days later. Rodgers and Hammerstein invited Irving Berlin to replace Kern, and the result was Annie Get Your Gun, which opened on May 16, 1946, at the Imperial Theatre, where it ran for nearly three years and 1,147 performances. It was Merman's (and Berlin's) longest-running show. During this time, Merman took only two vacations and missed only two performances due to illness. Berlin included ballads for Merman to sing, including "They Say It's Wonderful" and "I Got Lost in His Arms". Merman claimed that "Irving Berlin made a lady out of me." Berlin also included upbeat tunes for her, including "You Can't Get a Man with a Gun", "Doin' What Comes Natur'lly", "I Got the Sun in the Mornin'", "Anything You Can Do" and "There's No Business Like Show Business", which became an industry anthem. Merman lost her role in the film version to Judy Garland (who eventually was replaced by Betty Hutton), but starred in a Broadway revival two decades later at Lincoln Center alongside Bruce Yarnell, who was cast as Frank E. Butler, Annie Oakley's husband and manager. Yarnell was 27 years younger than Merman.

Merman and Berlin reunited for Call Me Madam in 1950, for which she won the Tony Award for Best Performance by a Leading Actress in a Musical. It ran for 644 performances. The score's high point was her duet with Russell Nype on "You're Just in Love". She starred in the 1953 screen adaptation as well, winning the Golden Globe Award for Best Actress – Motion Picture Musical or Comedy for her performance. The following year, she appeared as the matriarch of the singing and dancing Donahue family in There's No Business Like Show Business, a film with a score written by Berlin.

In 1953, she appeared on television with Mary Martin for The Ford 50th Anniversary Show, performing a nine-and-a-half minute song medley with Merman starting with "There's No Business Like Show Business", followed by Martin singing "I'm in Love with a Wonderful Guy", and continuing with the two combining on many other popular songs of the past 50 years.

Merman returned to Broadway at the behest of her third husband, Continental Airlines executive Robert Six, who was upset she had chosen to become a housewife in Colorado following their wedding in 1953. He expected her public appearances to generate publicity for the airline, and her decision to forgo the limelight did not sit well with him. He urged her to accept the lead in Happy Hunting, with a book by Howard Lindsay and Russel Crouse (who had written Call Me Madam) and a score by Harold Karr and Matt Dubey. Merman acquiesced to her husband's demands, although she clashed with the composers from the start and soon was at odds with co-star Fernando Lamas and his wife Arlene Dahl, who frequently attended rehearsals. The show opened in New York with an advance sale of $1.5 million, and despite Merman's dissatisfaction with it, garnered respectable reviews. Although Brooks Atkinson thought the score was "hardly more than adequate", he called Merman "as brassy as ever, glowing like a neon light whenever she steps on the stage." Several months into the run, she insisted that two of her least-favorite numbers be replaced by songs written by her friend Roger Edens, who, because of his exclusive contract with Metro-Goldwyn-Mayer, credited them to Kay Thompson. She lost the Tony Award to Judy Holliday in Bells Are Ringing, and the show closed after 412 performances, with Merman happy to see what she considered "a dreary obligation" come to an end.

=== Later career ===
Gypsy was based on the memoirs of Gypsy Rose Lee and starred Merman as Rose Hovick, her domineering stage mother, with music by Jule Styne, lyrics by Stephen Sondheim, and a book by Arthur Laurents. The musical opened on May 21, 1959 at the Broadway Theatre. Variety called the finale, "Rose's Turn", one of the most affecting songs of the musical theater. In the New York Post, Richard Watts called Merman "a brilliant actress", and Brooks Atkinson of The New York Times wrote that "She gives an indomitable performance, both as actress and singer." Theatre historian Stanley Green wrote in The World of Musical Comedy "just as the musical required more of Styne, it also required more of Merman, both met the challenges of the story with gifts never before revealed because they had never before been tested." Despite the acclaim, Merman lost the Tony Award to her close friend Mary Martin in The Sound of Music, and jokingly quipped "How are you going to buck a nun?" Shortly after she divorced Robert Six, his affair with television actress Audrey Meadows became public, and she found solace in her work.

Throughout the 702-performance run of Gypsy, Mervyn LeRoy saw it numerous times, repeatedly assuring Merman that he planned to cast her in the film adaptation he was preparing. Before the show's closing, it was announced that Rosalind Russell instead had been signed to star. Russell's husband, theater producer Frederick Brisson (whom Merman later called "the lizard of Roz"), had sold the screen rights to the Leonard Spigelgass play A Majority of One to Warner Bros. on the condition that his wife would star in both films. Because Russell was still a major box-office draw with the success of Auntie Mame a few years earlier, and Merman having never established herself as a popular screen presence, the studio agreed to Brisson's terms. Merman was devastated at this turn of events and called the loss of the role "the greatest professional disappointment of my life."

Following the Broadway closing of Gypsy on March 25, 1961, Merman halfheartedly embarked on the national tour. In San Francisco, she severely injured her back, but continued to perform for packed houses. During the Los Angeles run, LeRoy visited her backstage and claimed Russell was so ill that "I think you're going to end up getting this part." Believing the film version of Gypsy was within her grasp, she provided him with the many house seats he requested for friends and industry colleagues, only to discover she had been duped. Merman's role in Gypsy earned her an estimated $130,000 per year, plus an additional 10% of the box-office receipts. Gypsy ended up being the last original stage role she accepted.

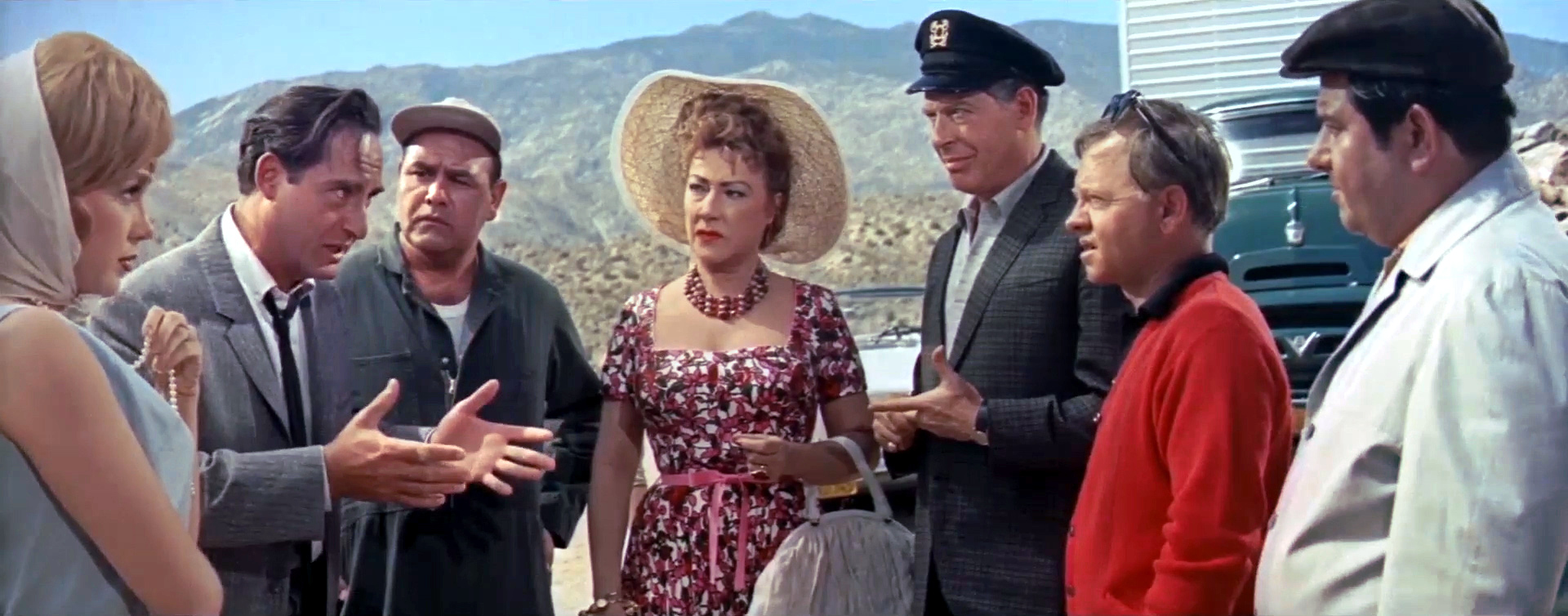
It's a Mad, Mad, Mad, Mad World (1963) trailer, featuring Edie Adams, Sid Caesar, Jonathan Winters, Merman, Milton Berle, Mickey Rooney, and Buddy Hackett

In 1963, Merman starred in the ensemble comedy film It's a Mad, Mad, Mad, Mad World alongside Spencer Tracy, Sid Caesar, Jonathan Winters, Phil Silvers, Buddy Hackett, and Mickey Rooney. Merman played Mrs. Marcus, the loudmouthed mother in-law of Milton Berle. The film was a major box-office success, earning $60 million on a budget of $9.4 million and becoming the third-highest-grossing film of 1963. It received six Academy Award nominations and one win. She also starred in the flop The Art of Love (1965).

In July 1965, Merman headlined a revival of Call Me Madam by the Valley Music Theater in which Richard Eastham and Russell Nype also reprised their Broadway roles. The production played an encore engagement—without Nype—in Houston that October. Merman, Eastham and Nype again reprised their Broadway roles for a 1967 summer stock tour of Call Me Madam.

She made dozens of television appearances on variety shows hosted by Perry Como, Red Skelton, Judy Garland, Dean Martin, Ed Sullivan, and Carol Burnett, talk shows with Mike Douglas, Dick Cavett, and Merv Griffin, and in episodes of That Girl, The Lucy Show, Match Game, Batman, Tarzan, and others.

Producer David Merrick encouraged Jerry Herman to compose the score of Hello, Dolly! specifically for Merman's vocal range, but when he offered her the role, she declined it. She finally joined the cast on March 28, 1970, six years after the production opened. On Merman's opening night, her performance was continually brought to a halt by prolonged standing ovations, and the critics unanimously heralded her return to the New York stage. Walter Kerr in The New York Times described her voice: "Exactly as trumpet-clean, exactly as penny whistle-piercing, exactly as Wurlitzer-wonderful as it always was." He wrote: "Her comic sense is every bit as authoritative, as high-handed, really, as her voice." The seventh actress to portray the scheming matchmaker in the original Broadway production, she remained with the musical for 210 performances until it closed on December 27, 1970. Merman received the Drama Desk Award for Outstanding Performance for what proved to be her last appearance on Broadway.

For the remainder of her career, Merman made frequent guest appearances on television. For instance, she appeared on Match Game for seven weeks between 1975 and 1978. In 1979, she recorded The Ethel Merman Disco Album, with many of her signature songs set to a disco beat. She was a guest host on an episode in the first season of The Muppet Show. Her last screen role was a self-parody in the 1980 comedy film Airplane!, in which she portrayed Lieutenant Hurwitz, a shell-shocked soldier who thinks he is Ethel Merman. In the cameo appearance, Merman leaps out of bed singing "Everything's Coming Up Roses" as orderlies sedate her. She appeared in several episodes of The Love Boat (playing Gopher's mother), guest-starred on a CBS tribute to George Gershwin, did a summer concert tour with Carroll O'Connor, played a two-week engagement at the London Palladium, performed with Mary Martin in a concert benefiting the theater and museum collection of the Museum of the City of New York, and frequently appeared as a soloist with symphony orchestras.

Since 1974, she also volunteered at St. Luke's-Roosevelt Hospital Center (now Mount Sinai West), which had treated her parents, working in the escort service and gift shop or visiting patients.

=== Performance style ===
Merman was known for her powerful mezzo-soprano voice, belting, precise enunciation, and pitch. Because stage singers performed without microphones when Merman began singing professionally, she had a great advantage, despite never taking vocal lessons. Broadway lore holds that George Gershwin advised her never to take such lessons after she opened in Girl Crazy. She eventually took a voice lesson late in her career during a tour of Gypsy.

Caryl Flinn's 2007 biography includes many quotes from reviews of Merman's work, most of which were compliments to her. Brooks Atkinson summed up her talent:

She makes a song seem like a spontaneous expression of her personality, which may be regarded as the ultimate skill in the art of singing songs.

Cole Porter once said:

When you write lyrics for Ethel Merman they'd better be good because everyone's going to hear them.

== Personal life ==
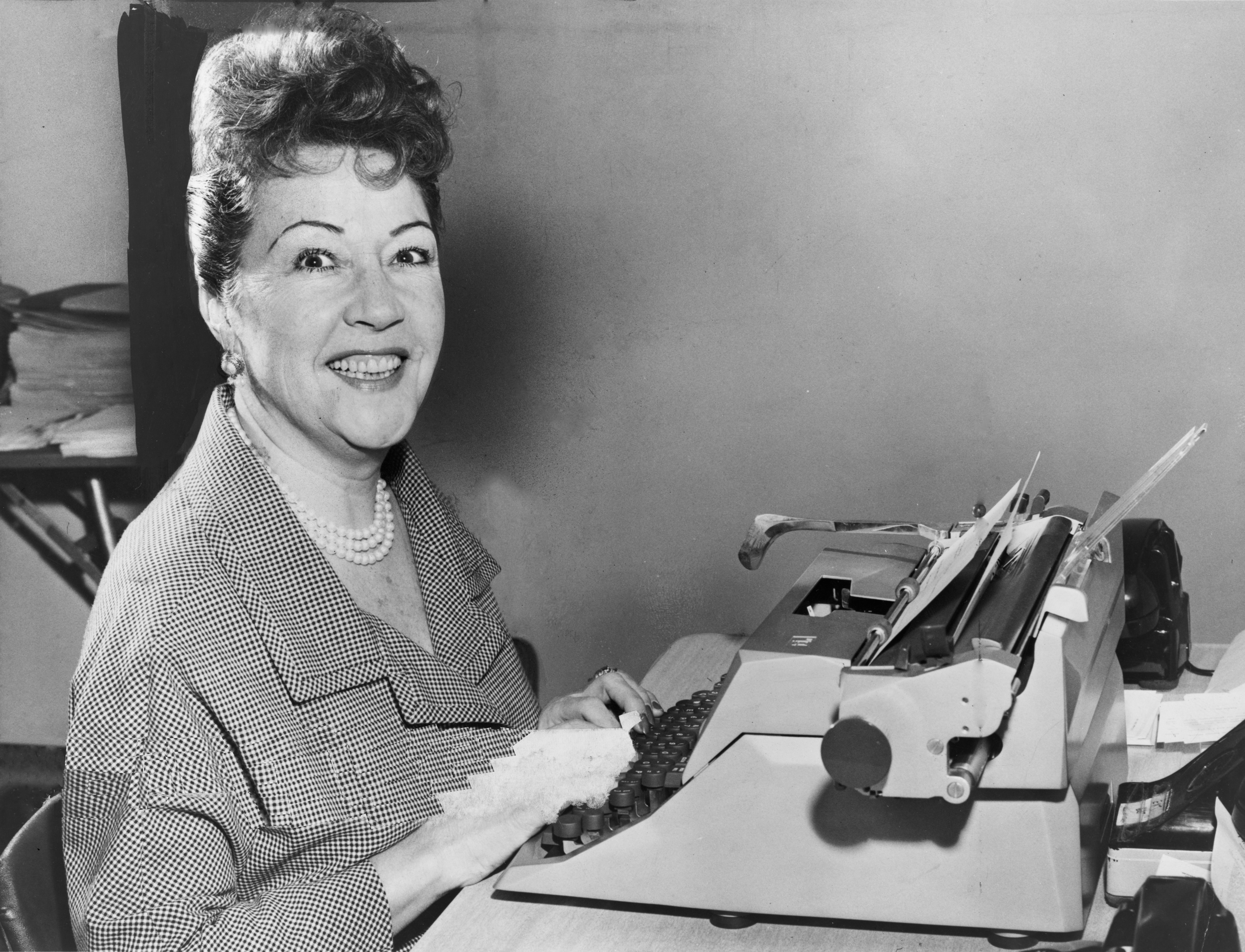
Merman at a typewriter in 1953

=== Marriages and children ===
Merman was married and divorced four times. Her first marriage, in 1940, was to theatrical agent William Smith. They were divorced in 1941. Later that same year, Merman married newspaper executive Robert Levitt. The couple had two children: Ethel (born July 20, 1942) and Robert Jr. (born August 11, 1945). Merman and Levitt were divorced in 1952. In March 1953, Merman married Robert Six, the president of Continental Airlines. They separated in December 1959 and were divorced in 1960. According to Merman's son, he, his sister and mother and even his elderly grandparents had suffered emotional and physical violence from Six. Merman's fourth and final marriage was to actor Ernest Borgnine. They were married in Beverly Hills on June 27, 1964, separated on August 7, 1964, and Borgnine filed for divorce on October 21, 1964. Merman filed a cross-complaint shortly thereafter charging Borgnine with extreme cruelty. She was granted a divorce on November 18, 1964. An oft recounted story from their short marriage demonstrated the volatility of their relationship. When Borgnine asked Merman how her audition had gone, she replied: "Well, they were mad about my 35-year-old body, my 35-year-old voice, and my 35-year-old face." "Is that so?" Borgnine responded. "And what did they think of your 65-year-old cunt?" Without missing a beat, Merman retorted: "You weren’t mentioned once."

In a radio interview, Merman said of her numerous marriages: "We all make mistakes. That's why they put rubbers on pencils, and that's what I did. I made a few lulus!" In her 1978 autobiography Merman, the chapter entitled "My Marriage to Ernest Borgnine" was a blank page.

Ethel Levitt, her daughter, died on August 23, 1967, of a drug overdose that was ruled accidental. Her son Robert Jr., was married to actress Barbara Colby. Colby, at the time estranged from Robert, was shot and killed (along with a friend, James Kiernan), in a parking garage in Los Angeles in July 1975. The shooting was by apparent gang members who had no clear motive.

=== Profanity ===
Merman was notorious for her brash demeanor and for telling vulgar stories at public parties. For instance, she once shouted a dirty joke across the room at José Ferrer during a formal reception.

While rehearsing a guest appearance on The Loretta Young Show, Merman exclaimed "Where the hell does this go?" Young, who was a devout Catholic, advanced towards Merman waving an empty coffee can, saying, "Miss Merman, you said the 'H' word! That'll be twenty-five cents."—to which Merman replied, "Tell me, Loretta, how much will it cost me to tell you to go fuck yourself?"

=== Politics ===
Merman, a lifelong Republican, was a frequent guest of Dwight D. Eisenhower's at the White House. She was noted as saying, "Eisenhower was my war hero and the President I admire and respect most." On January 20, 1981, she performed "Everything's Coming up Roses" at the first inauguration of Ronald Reagan. She had previously sung the same song at a pre-inaugural gala for John F. Kennedy, but it was never broadcast.

== Autobiographies ==
Merman co-wrote two memoirs. The first, Who Could Ask for Anything More? (1955), was published by Doubleday & Co. and written with the assistance of Pete Martin. The second, Merman (1978), was published by Simon & Schuster and written with George Eels.

== Later life and death ==
Merman became forgetful with advancing age, and on occasion, had difficulty with her speech. At times, her behavior was erratic, causing concern among her friends. On April 7, 1983, she was preparing to travel to Los Angeles, to appear on the 55th Academy Awards telecast, when she collapsed in her apartment. Merman was taken to Roosevelt Hospital (now Mount Sinai West), where doctors initially thought she had suffered a stroke. After undergoing exploratory surgery on April 11, she was diagnosed with stage four glioblastoma. The New York Times reported that she underwent brain surgery to have the tumor removed, but it was inoperable and her condition was deemed terminal (doctors gave Merman eight and a half months to live). The tumor caused her to become aphasic, and as her illness progressed, she lost her hair and her face swelled. According to her biographer Brian Kellow, Merman's family and manager did not want the true nature of her condition revealed to the public. Merman's son, Robert Jr., who took charge of her care, later said he chose not to publicly disclose his mother's condition because she strove to keep her personal life private. He stated, "Mom truly appreciated [her fans'] presence and their applause. But you shouldn't attempt to be personal—she drew lines, and she could cut you off."

Merman's health eventually stabilized enough for her to be taken back to her apartment in Manhattan. On February 15, 1984, 10 months after she was diagnosed with brain cancer, Merman died at her home at the age of 76. On the evening of Merman's death, all 36 theaters on Broadway dimmed their lights at 9 pm in her honor. A private funeral service for Merman was held in a chapel at St. Bartholomew's Episcopal Church on February 27, after which Merman was cremated at the Frank E. Campbell Funeral Chapel. In accordance with her wishes, Merman's remains were given to her son Robert Jr. Her urn was entombed within the Shrine of Remembrance Mausoleum in Colorado Springs, Colorado, next to her daughter Ethel.

Upon her death, Merman left an estate estimated to be worth $1.5 million (equivalent to $4.6 million in 2025) to be divided among her son and two grandchildren.

On October 10, 1984, an auction of her personal effects, including furniture, artwork, and theater memorabilia, earned over $120,000 (equivalent to $372,000 in 2025) at Christie's East. The 56th Academy Awards, held on April 2, 1984, ended with a performance of "There's No Business Like Show Business" as a tribute to Merman.

== Work ==
=== Theater ===
| Year | Title | Role | Venue |
|---|---|---|---|
| 1930 | Girl Crazy | Kate Fothergill | Alvin Theatre, Broadway |
| 1931 | George White's Scandals of 1931 | Performer | Apollo Theatre, Broadway |
| 1932 | Take a Chance | Various roles | Apollo Theatre, Broadway |
| 1934 | Anything Goes | Reno Sweeney | Alvin Theatre, Broadway |
| 1936 | Red, Hot and Blue | Nails O'Reilly Duquesne | Alvin Theatre, Broadway |
| 1939 | Stars in Your Eyes | Jeanette Adair | Majestic Theatre, Broadway |
| 1939 | Du Barry Was a Lady | May Daly/Mme. Du Barry | 46th Street Theatre, Broadway |
| 1940 | Panama Hattie | Hattie Maloney | 46th Street Theatre, Broadway |
| 1943 | Something for the Boys | Blossom Hart | Alvin Theatre, Broadway |
| 1944 | Sadie Thompson | Sadie Thompson | Alvin Theatre, Broadway |
| 1946 | Annie Get Your Gun | Annie Oakley | Imperial Theatre, Broadway |
| 1950 | Call Me Madam | Mrs. Sally Adams | Imperial Theatre, Broadway |
| 1956 | Happy Hunting | Liz Livingstone | Majestic Theatre, Broadway |
| 1959 | Gypsy | Rose Hovick | Broadway Theatre, Broadway |
| 1965 | Call Me Madam | Mrs. Sally Adams | Valley Music Theater, Los Angeles |
| 1966 | Annie Get Your Gun | Annie Oakley | Broadway Theatre, Broadway |
| 1970 | Hello, Dolly! | Mrs. Dolly Levi (replacement) | St. James Theatre, Broadway |
| 1977 | Mary Martin & Ethel Merman: Together On Broadway | Performer | Broadway Theatre, Broadway |

=== Filmography ===
| Year | Title | Role | Notes |
|---|---|---|---|
| 1930 | Follow the Leader | Helen King | |
| 1934 | We're Not Dressing | Edith | |
| 1934 | Kid Millions | Dot Clark | |
| 1935 | The Big Broadcast of 1936 | Herself | |
| 1936 | Strike Me Pink | Joyce Lennox | |
| 1936 | Anything Goes | Reno Sweeney | |
| 1938 | Happy Landing | Flo Kelly | |
| 1938 | Alexander's Ragtime Band | Jerry Allen | |
| 1938 | Straight, Place and Show | Linda Tyler | |
| 1943 | Stage Door Canteen | Herself | |
| 1953 | Call Me Madam | Sally Adams | |
| 1954 | There's No Business Like Show Business | Molly Donahue | |
| 1963 | It's a Mad, Mad, Mad, Mad World | Mrs. Marcus | |
| 1965 | The Art of Love | Madame Coco La Fontaine | |
| 1972 | Journey Back to Oz | Mombi, the Bad Witch | Voice; Animated film |
| 1976 | Won Ton Ton, the Dog Who Saved Hollywood | Hedda Parsons | |
| 1980 | Airplane! | Lieutenant Hurwitz/Herself | |

=== Television ===
| Year | Title | Role | Notes |
|---|---|---|---|
| 1949 | The Milton Berle Show | Herself | 3 episodes |
| 1949 | Inside the U.S.A. with Chevrolet | Herself | Episode: "Ethel Merman" |
| 1950 | This Is Show Business | Herself | Episode: #2.27 |
| 1953 | The Ford 50th Anniversary Show | Herself | Song medley duet with Mary Martin |
| 1954 | The Colgate Comedy Hour | Reno Sweeney | Episode: "Anything Goes" |
| 1954 | The Best of Broadway' | Hattie Maloney | Episode: "Panama Hattie" |
| 1954 | Panama Hattie | Hattie Maloney | Television movie |
| 1955 | The Ed Sullivan Show | Herself/Guest Host | 9 episodes |
| 1956 | General Electric Theatre | Muriel Flood | Episode: "Reflected Glory" |
| 1956 | The United States Steel Hour | Libby Marks | Episode: "Honest in the Rain" |
| 1958 | The Frank Sinatra Show | Herself | Episode: "Ethel Merman" |
| 1961 | Merman on Broadway | Herself | Television special |
| 1962 | The Bob Hope Special | Herself | March and November television specials |
| 1963 | The Lucy Show | Herself | 2 episodes |
| 1963 | The Judy Garland Show | Herself | 2 episodes |
| 1963 | The Jerry Lewis Show | Herself | Episode: #1.7 |
| 1963 | Maggie Brown | Maggie Brown | Unsold pilot |
| 1963 | Vacation Playhouse | Maggie Brown | Episode: "Maggie Brown" |
| 1963 | The Red Skelton Hour | Mother Hughes | Episode: "Get Thee to the Canery" |
| 1963–65 | What's My Line | Mystery Guest | 2 episodes |
| 1965 | Kraft Suspense Theatre | Clara Lovelace | Episode: "Twist the Cup and the Lip" |
| 1965 | An Evening with Ethel Merman | Herself | Television special |
| 1965–79 | The Tonight Show with Johnny Carson | Herself/Musical Guest | 26 episodes |
| 1967 | Annie Get Your Gun | Annie Oakley | Television movie |
| 1967 | Tarzan and the Mountains of the Moon | Rosanna McCloud | 2 episodes |
| 1967 | Batman | Lola Lasagne | 3 episodes |
| 1967–68 | That Girl | Herself | 2 episodes |
| 1969 | The Carol Burnett Show | Herself | Episode: #2.20 |
| 1969 | The Jonathan Winters Show | Herself | Episode: "Ethel Merman, Steve Allen, and the Third Wave" |
| 1972 | 'S Wonderful, 'S Marvelous, 'S Gershwin | Herself | Television special |
| 1973 | The Dick Cavett Show | Herself | Episode: "Ethel Merman, the Harlem Globetrotters" |
| 1976 | The Muppet Show | Special Guest Star | Episode: "Ethel Merman" |
| 1977 | You're Gonna Love It Here | Lolly Rogers | Television movie - unsold pilot |
| 1978 | A Salute to American Imagination | Herself | Television documentary |
| 1978 | A Special Sesame Street Christmas | Herself | Television movie |
| 1979 | Rudolph and Frosty's Christmas in July | Lilly Loraine | Voice; television movie |
| 1979–82 | The Love Boat | Roz Smith | 6 episodes |
| 1981 | Great Performances | Herself | 2 episodes |
| 1982 | Broadway! A Special Salute | Herself | Television special |
| 1982 | Night of 100 Stars | Herself | Television special |

=== Discography ===
Selected albums

- Annie Get Your Gun (1946)
- Songs from "Call Me Madam" (1950)
- Gypsy – A Musical Fable (1959)
- The Ethel Merman Disco Album (1979)

Hit records

- "How Deep Is the Ocean?" (1932) #14 US Billboard Best Sellers
- "Eadie Was a Lady" (1933) US #8
- "An Earful of Music" (1934) US #11
- "You're the Top" (1934) US #4
- "I Get a Kick Out of You" (1935) US #12
- "Move It Over" (1943) US #14
- "They Say It's Wonderful" (1946) US #20 (with Ray Middleton)
- "Dearie" (1950) US #12 (with Ray Bolger)
- "I Said My Pajamas (and Put On My Prayers)" (1950) US #20 (with Ray Bolger)
- "If I Knew You Were Comin' I'd've Baked a Cake" (1950) US #15
- "You're Just in Love" (1951) US #30 (with Dick Haymes)
- "Once Upon a Nickel" (1951) US #29 (with Ray Bolger)

== Awards and nominations ==
| Year | Award | Category | Nominated work | Result |
|---|---|---|---|---|
| 1951 | Tony Award | Best Actress in a Musical | Call Me Madam | Won |
| 1957 | Tony Award | Best Actress in a Musical | Happy Hunting | Nominated |
| 1960 | Tony Award | Best Actress in a Musical | Gypsy | Nominated |
| 1972 | Tony Award | Special Tony Award | —N/a | Honored |
| 1953 | Golden Globe Award | Best Actress – Motion Picture Musical or Comedy | Call Me Madam | Won |
| 1960 | Grammy Award | Best Broadway Show Album | Gypsy | Won |
| 1970 | Drama Desk Award | Outstanding Actress in a Musical | Hello, Dolly! | Won |

She received two stars on the Hollywood Walk of Fame in 1960. One for her contribution to the motion picture industry at 7044 Hollywood Boulevard and one for recording at 1751 Vine Street.

Merman was in the inaugural class of inductees to the American Theater Hall of Fame in 1972.
