= Doin' What Comes Natur'lly =

Song from the musical Annie Get Your Gun

"Doin' What Comes Natur'lly" is a song from the 1946 musical Annie Get Your Gun, written by Irving Berlin. The song was introduced by Ethel Merman in the original production of the musical. Other singers to have recorded the song include Betty Hutton, Judy Garland, Bernadette Peters, Suzi Quatro, The DeMarco Sisters, and Dinah Shore.

In the song, Annie Oakley, her brother (Little Jake), sisters (Minnie, Jessie, and Nellie), and the owner of the Wilson Hotel (Foster Wilson) sing jokingly about how the Oakley family and their community live happy lives despite their lack of education and, often, money.

It was released as a 78 rpm 10-inch record by MGM in the 1950s.
