= There's No Business Like Show Business =

Irving Berlin song from Annie Get Your Gun

Song by Ethel Merman
- Published: 1946
- Genre: Pop standard
- Composer: Irving Berlin

"There's No Business Like Show Business" is an Irving Berlin song, written for the 1946 musical Annie Get Your Gun and orchestrated by Ted Royal. The song, a slightly tongue-in-cheek salute to the glamour and excitement of a life in show business, is sung in the musical by members of Buffalo Bill's Wild West Show in an attempt to persuade Annie Oakley to join the production. It is reprised three times in the musical.

In 1953, Ethel Merman sang the song before a live television audience of 60 million persons, broadcast live over the NBC and CBS networks, as part of The Ford 50th Anniversary Show.

== Film ==
The song is also featured in the 1954 movie of the same name, where it is notably sung by Ethel Merman as the main musical number. The movie, in which she starred with Marilyn Monroe and was directed by Walter Lang, is essentially a catalog of various Berlin pieces, in the same way that Singin' in the Rain—which starred Donald O'Connor as well—was a collection of Arthur Freed songs. There was also a disco version of the song made during the 1970s, with Merman reprising her singing role in The Ethel Merman Disco Album in 1979. The song became one of Ethel Merman's standards and was often performed by her at concerts and on television.

== Other recordings ==
"There's No Business Like Show Business"

Song by The Andrews Sisters featuring Bing Crosby and Dick Haymes
- Released: 1947
- Composer: Irving Berlin

Other singers to have recorded the song include Judy Garland, The Andrews Sisters (with Bing Crosby and Dick Haymes), Frank Sinatra, Harry Connick Jr. (from Come by Me, 1999), Susannah McCorkle, Mary Hopkin, and Bernadette Peters.

The Andrews Sisters version with Bing Crosby and Dick Haymes was recorded on 19 March 1947 and was the only version to reach the Billboard charts, albeit briefly at No. 25.

In his liner notes for Susannah McCorkle's version of the song on her Ballad Essentials album Scott Yanow writes "usually performed as a corny razzle-dazzle romp, that piece was drastically slowed down by Susannah who performed all of its known lyrics, including stanzas that show Irving Berlin's lyrics were actually quite touching and meaningful".

Tenor saxophonist Sonny Rollins did a rendition of the tune on his 1956 Prestige album, Work Time.

== Popular culture ==
- Borscht Belt entertainer Allan Sherman parodied the song as "There’s No Governor Like Our New Governor" to poke fun at California's election of Hollywood actor Ronald Reagan.
- The Canadian band Sweeney Todd included part of the lyrics in their song "Say Hello Say Goodbye" from their album If Wishes Were Horses.
- The Ethel Merman recording is featured in the film All That Jazz (1979).
- From 1976 to 2007 the rock band Genesis played the Ethel Merman recording at the end of gigs—it can be heard at the end of their 1977 live album Seconds Out.
- The song is featured during the epilogue of the HBO film The Late Shift.
- During the credits of Noises Off, Niki Haris sings a form of the song.
- In the 2000 musical film version of Love's Labour's Lost, Nathan Lane sings a version of the song.
- Liza Minnelli performed a portion of the song on her 1992 album "Live From Radio City Music Hall."
- In RuPaul's Drag Race: All Stars season 1, contestants Latrice Royale and Tammie Brown performed a lip-sync to the Ethel Merman version for the episode "RuPaul's Gaff-In."
- British comedian and impressionist Bobby Davro included a sketch "The Kidnapping of Bonnie Langford" on his 1980s ITV show, which concluded with Langford (played by Jessica Martin) loudly performing the song in order to nauseate her kidnappers into releasing her.
- The song is sampled in Taco's cover of another Irving Berlin song, "Puttin' On the Ritz", released in 1982.
- The song's opening line forms the basis for a dialog between R.K. Maroon and Eddie Valiant in the film Who Framed Roger Rabbit (1988).
- An instrumental version of the song is used as part of the score in the Australian variety show Hey Hey It's Saturday.
- Mary Hopkin's version is used in season 2 of "The Marvelous Mrs. Maisel".
- This song has been performed twice in different episodes on The Muppet Show, each performed by Ethel Merman and Phyllis George.

== Notes and references ==
- America's Songs: The Stories Behind the Songs of Broadway, Hollywood, and Tin Pan Alley, Philip Furia, Michael L. Lasser. Routledge, 2006, ISBN 978-0-415-97246-8, p. 206
