= Six Songs =

Six Songs may refer to:

== Music ==
=== Classical compositions ===
- A number of compositions by Charles Gounod (1818–1893)
- A number of compositions by Alexander von Zemlinsky (1871–1942)
- A number of compositions by Ludwig van Beethoven (1770–1827)
- A number of compositions by Edvard Grieg (1843–1907)
- A number of compositions by Paul Hindemith (1895–1963)
- A number of compositions by Max Reger (1873–1916)
- Six Songs, Op. 8 (1868–1870), by Nikolai Rimsky-Korsakov
- Six songs, Op. 4, by Sergei Rachmaninoff (1873–1943)
- Six Songs, Op. 36 (Sibelius) (1899–1900) by Jean Sibelius
- Six Songs, Op. 50 (Sibelius) (1906) by Jean Sibelius
- Six Songs, Op. 40 (Pfitzner) (1932) by Hans Pfitzner

=== Albums, EPs, and demos ===
- Melvins! (album), also known as Six Songs, by the Melvins (1986)
- 6 Songs, a demo by The Offspring

== See also ==
- Six Partsongs (1893–1901) by Jean Sibelius
- Six Songs from A Shropshire Lad (1911) by George Butterworth
- Six Runeberg Songs (1917) by Jean Sibelius
- 6 Songs for Bruce, a 1985 demo cassette by Soundgarden
- Six Songs with Mike Singing, a 1985 EP from Eye for an Eye (Corrosion of Conformity album)
- Six Songs of Hellcity Trendkill, a 2002 EP by Private Line
- Seis canciones españolas (1939), by Matilde Salvador i Segarra
- Seis canciones del Alto Duero para voz y piano by Manuel Valls (1920–1984)
- Seis Canciones Escolares by María Luisa Sepúlveda (1898–1958)
- Seis canciones españolas by Miguel Ángel Coria (1937–2016)
- Seis canciones portuguesas (1940–41), by Ernesto Halffter
- Seis canciones Castellanas by Conrado del Campo(1878–1953)
- Seis canciones castellanas (Six Castilian Songs) (1939), by Jesús Guridi
- Six chansons pour piano (1950–51), by Iannis Xenakis
- (6) Chansons de théâtre Op. 151b (1936), by Darius Milhaud
