= Pyrenean Symphony =

Three movement symphony of the spanish composer Jesus Guridi

The Sinfonía pirenaica (Pyrenean Symphony), inspired by the Pyrenees, was composed by Jesús Guridi in 1945 and premiered on 8 February 1946 in Bilbao by the Bilbao Municipal Orchestra conducted by Jesús Arámbarri.

Lasting c. 49 minutes, it consists of three movements:

1. Andante sostenuto — Allegro molto moderato
2. Presto ma non troppo
3. Allegro brioso

All three movements are based in the sonata form, while the harmonic language reflects Basque folk music through the use of altered thirds and sevenths in a major tonality. While it is an abstract symphony lacking a programme, it usually comes close to the tone of a symphonic poem and it features descriptive effects.

== Recordings ==
- Bilbao Symphony — Juanjo Mena. Naxos, 2003.
