= Sociedad Coral de Bilbao =

The Bilbao Choral Society (Sociedad Coral de Bilbao) is an association devoted to fostering musical activity. Founded in 1886 under the name "Orfeón Bilbaíno", the Bilbao Choir (in Basque known as "Bilboko Koral Elkartea") is a non-profit cultural association declared "of General Interest" by the Basque Autonomous Government. Nowadays it comprises three adult choirs and a conservatory choir.

During its long life, the Society has been awarded numerous prizes and distinctions, both in Spain and abroad, such as the Medal of Merit in the Beautiful Arts on the occasion of its 100th anniversary.

== Choirs ==
=== Mixed choir ===
The senior Choir started in 1886 with Choirmaster Cleto Zabala, featuring only male voices. A few years later women were admitted. Throughout the choir's long career, it has been conducted by the following masters: Aureliano Valle, Jesús Guridi, Arturo Inchausti, Timoteo Urrengoechea, J. M. Olaizola, Modesto Arana, Rafael Frühbeck de Burgos, Juan Cordero, Urbano Ruiz Laorden, Julen Ezkurra, Gorka Sierra, Iñaki Moreno, Joan Cabero, Julio Gergely and actually by Enrique Azurza.

The Choir specialises in the great Symphonic-choral repertoire and has worked with many important conductors, namely: Fernández Arbós, Pérez Casas, Wladimir Golscham, Jesús Arámbarri, Lamote de Grignon, Ataúlfo Argenta, Jascha Horenstein, Sir Malcolm Sargent, Odón Alonso, Antoni Ros Marbá, Miguel Ángel Gómez Martínez, Moshe Atzmon, Mstislav Rostropovich, Theo Alcántara, Michel Plasson, Víctor Pablo Pérez, Jan Lathan-Koenig, Arturo Tamayo, Aldo Ceccato, Hans Graf, Juanjo Mena, Gianandrea Noseda, Elio Boncompagni, Michaël Schönwadt, Georges Prêtre, Alexander Rahbari, John Nelson, Josep Pons, Jerzy Semkow, Alexandre Dmitriev, Yutaka Sado, Martin Haselböck, Michiyoshi Inoue, Eric Whitacre and Christoph Spering.

The Bilbao Choir regularly takes part in Stage Productions of operas and zarzuelas and even representations of works like Debussy's Le Martyre de Saint Sébastien, together with the avant-garde stage company La Fura dels Baus.

The work of the Society also includes choral works and operas of composers such as Mikis Theodorakis' Medea, 1990; premiered at the Arriaga Theatre in Bilbao), and Francisco Escudero's Gernika, an opera in concert version.

The Choir has premiered in Spain such works as Brahms' Ein deutsches Requiem, Orff's Carmina Burana, Verdi's Requiem, Ligeti's Requiem, Mendelssohn's Elijah and Vaughan Williams' Hodie. A female section of the choir presented in the Guggenheim Bilbao Museum atrium Mike Oldfield's Music of the Spheres.

== Recordings ==
Recent recordings, mostly of stage music include Goyescas, an opera by Enrice Granados, Puccini's Turandot, Francisco Escudero's Gernika as well as Jesús Guridi's Amaya and El Caserío.

=== Euskeria Choir ===
The Euskeria Choir is the junior choir of the society. It is currently conducted by Urko Sangroniz.

=== Conservatory Choir ===
The Conservatory Choir, or Childrens Choir, was founded in 1984 by Gorka Sierra. José Luis Ormazabal has been chorus master since 1995. The Choir has performed all over Spain, including the Auditorio Nacional in Madrid, with Mahler's 8th Symphony. Their most relevant recording includes works by Spanish composers Antón García Abril and Jesús Guridi.
