= Op. 36 =

In music, Op. 36 stands for Opus number 36. Compositions that are assigned this number include:

- Ashton – Enigma Variations
- Beethoven – Symphony No. 2
- Brahms – String Sextet No. 2
- Britten – String Quartet No. 2
- Bruch – Symphony No. 2
- Chopin – Impromptu No. 2
- Clementi – 6 Sonatinas
- Elgar – Enigma Variations
- Górecki – Symphony No. 3
- Grieg – Cello Sonata
- Hindemith – Kammermusik
- Klebe – Alkmene
- Korngold – Die stumme Serenade
- Mendelssohn – St. Paul
- Moszkowski – Étincelles
- Myaskovsky – Symphony No. 13
- Rachmaninoff – Piano Sonata No. 2
- Rimskij Korsakov – Russian Easter Festival Overture
- Rózsa – Toccata capricciosa for cello, Op. 36
- Schumann – 6 Gedichte
- Sibelius – Six Songs, Op. 36, collection of art songs (1899–1900)
- Tchaikovsky – Symphony No. 4
- Vieuxtemps – Viola Sonata No. 1
- Waterhouse – Celtic Voices and Hale Bopp
