= Bilbao Orkestra Sinfonikoa =

Symphony orchestra in Bilbao

Bilbao Orkestra Sinfonikoa (BOS)
- Orchestra
- Official logo
- Founded: 1922
- Principal conductor: Erik Nielsen
- Website: bilbaorkestra.eus/en/

Bilbao Orkestra Sinfonikoa (BOS; Spanish: Orquesta Sinfónica de Bilbao, unofficial English translation: Bilbao Symphony Orchestra) is a symphony orchestra based in Bilbao, Basque Country.

Its current principal conductor is Erik Nielsen from 2015.

== History ==
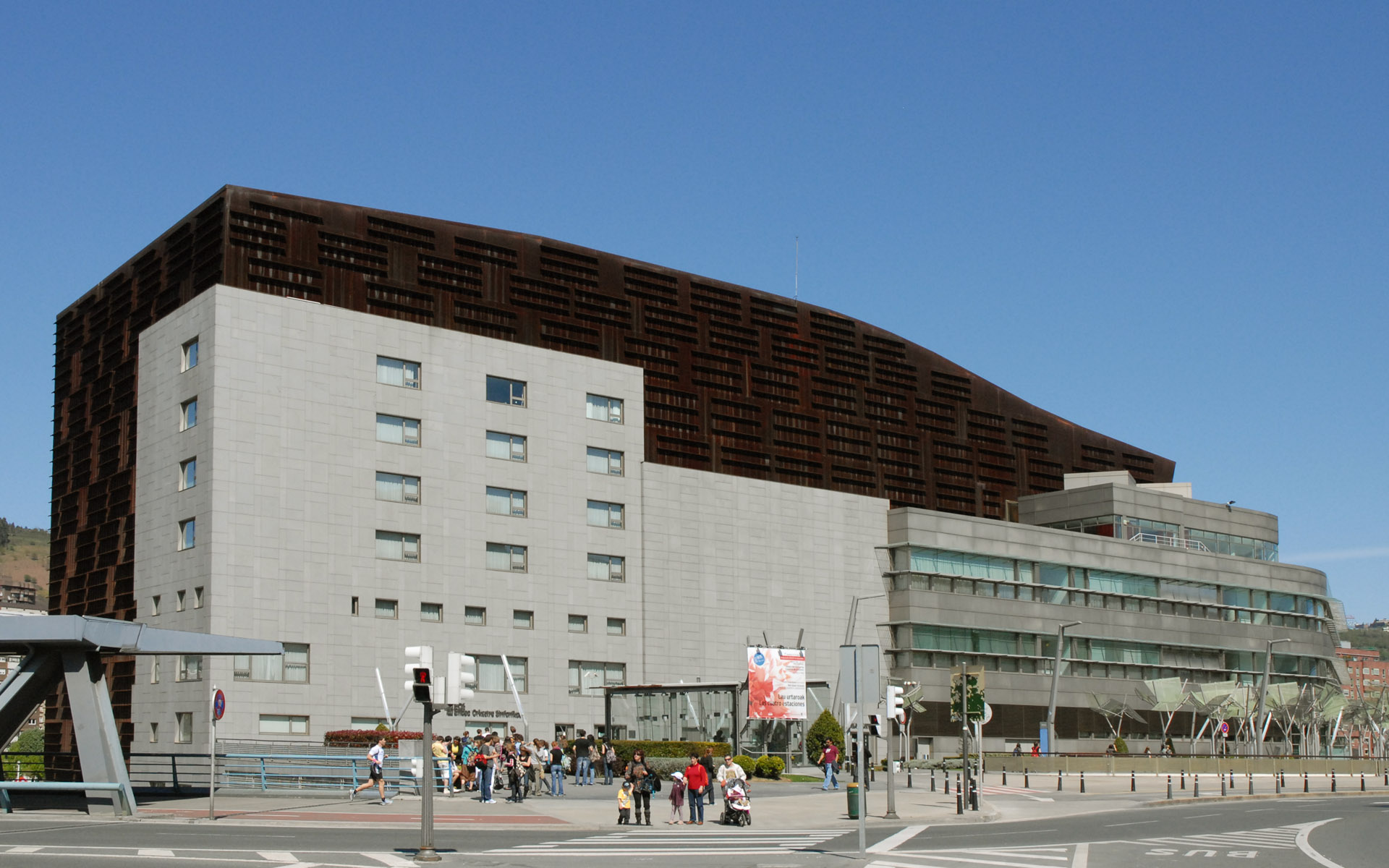
Euskalduna Conference Centre and Concert Hall, where the subscription season is held

The orchestra's first concert was on May 8, 1922 at the Teatro Arriaga, under the direction of maestro Armand Marsick (nephew of Martin Pierre Marsick).

Principal conductors have been Armand Marsick, Vladimir Golschmann, Jesús Arámbarri, José Limantour, Antoine de Babier, Rafael Frühbeck de Burgos, Alberto Bolet, Pedro Pirfano, Urbano Ruiz Laorden and Theo Alcántara. Günter Neuhold has been music director and Chief Conductor since 2008.

It has also been conducted by Maurice Ravel, Jesús Guridi, Pablo Sorozábal, Krzysztof Penderecki, Carmelo Bernaola, Luis de Pablo, Ernesto and Cristóbal Halffter and other composers performing their own works.

The BOS was invited to perform at Mariinski Theatre in Saint Petersburg, Russia, for the 300th Anniversary of the city. In 1998 it represented the Basque Country at the World Expo in Lisbon, and in 1999 it took part in the inauguration of the Euskalduna Palace in Bilbao.

The BOS performs regularly at the National Auditorium in Madrid and the Musical Fortnight in Donostia, in addition to engagements at the Santander International Festival, Paris Festival, and the Religious Music Festival in Cuenca.

== Principal conductors ==
- Armand Marsick
- Vladimir Golschmann
- Jesus Aranbarri Garate
- José Limantour
- Antoine de Bavier
- Rafael Frühbeck
- Alberto Bolet
- Pedro Pirfano
- Urbano Ruiz Laorden
- Theo Alcántara
- Juanjo Mena
- Günter Neuhold
- Erik Nielsen

== Recordings ==
In the 1980s, the era of López Cobos ("Obras de Arriaga") and Lorenzo Martínez Palomo ("Obras de Madina"), the BOS arranged its first most noteworthy recordings. At the end of the nineties an agreement was reached with the multi-national company NAXOS to record 30 CDs, and the results of these are now appearing.

=== Operas ===
Album	Conductor	Soloits and Choirs	Label	Discs	Release year
GURIDI: Amaya (complete opera)	Theo Alcántara	Marianne Cornetti, Cesar Hernandez, Rebecca Copley, Itxaro Mentxaka, Carlos Conde, Rosendo Flores, Angel Pazos, Bilbao Choral Society	Marco Polo	2	2000
GURIDI: El Caserío (musical numbers from the zarzuela)	Juanjo Mena	Vicente Sardinero, Ana Rodrigo, Maria José Suarez, Emilio Sanchez, Fernando Latorre, Felipe Nieto, Bilbao Choral Society	Naxos	1	2006
USANDIZAGA: Mendi Mendiyan (complete opera)	Juanjo Mena	José Antonio Carril, Santos Ariño, Marta Ubieta, Tatiana Davidova, Juan Lomba, Coral Andra Mari	Marco Polo	1	2005

=== Vocal, choral and orchestral works ===
Album	Conductor	Soloists and Choirs	Label	Discs	Release year
GURIDI: Ten Basque Melodies	Juanjo Mena	Isabel Álvarez (soprano), Chorus of the Conservatory of the Bilbao Choral Society	Naxos	1	2003
GURIDI: Sinfonía pirenaica	Juanjo Mena		Naxos	1	2005
ISASI: Symphony No.2	Juanjo Mena		Naxos	1	2004
SARASATE: Violin Showpieces Vol.1	Juanjo Mena	Si-Qing Lu (violin)	Naxos	1	2004
ARAMBARRI: Eight Basque Songs	Juanjo Mena	Itxaro Mentxaka (soprano)	Naxos	1	2003
ESCUDERO: Illeta	Juanjo Mena	Ricardo Salaberria (baritone), Coral Andra Mari	Naxos	1	2005
