= Philharmonisches Staatsorchester Hamburg =

German symphony orchestra

- Orchestra
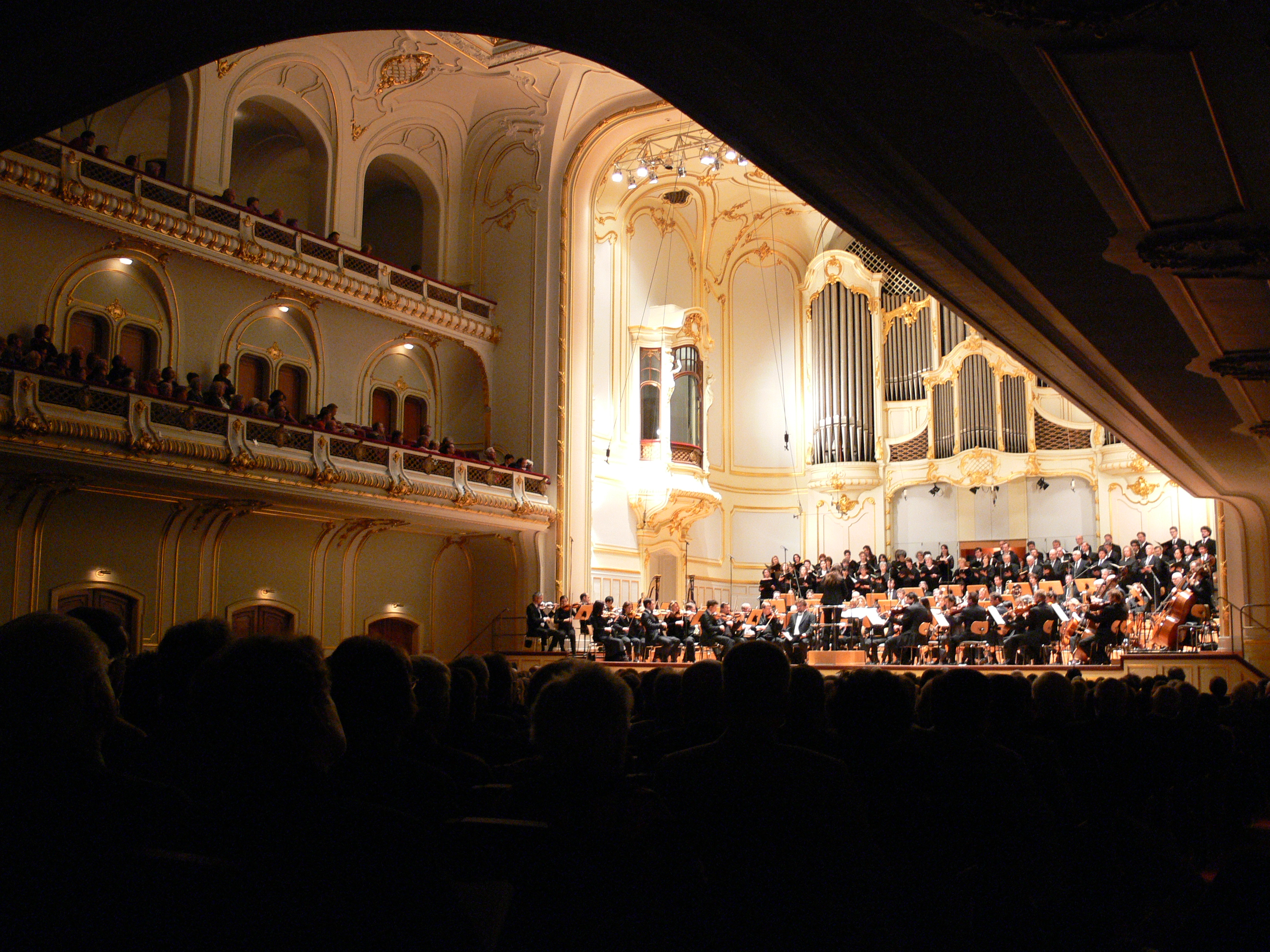
- The Philharmoniker Hamburg performing in the Laeiszhalle (2007)
- Former name: Philharmonische Gesellschaft
- Founded: 9 November 1828
- Location: Große Theaterstraße 25; 20354 Hamburg, Germany
- Concert hall: Laeiszhalle
- Principal conductor: Omer Meir Wellber (since 2025)
- Website: staatsorchester-hamburg.de

The Philharmonisches Staatsorchester Hamburg (Hamburg Philharmonic State Orchestra) is an internationally renowned symphony orchestra based in Hamburg. From 2015 to 2025, Kent Nagano was General Music Director (Generalmusikdirektor) and chief conductor (Chefdirigent). The Hamburg Philharmonic State Orchestra also serves as the orchestra of the Hamburg State Opera. The orchestra is one of three major orchestras in Hamburg, the others being the Hamburger Symphoniker and the NDR Elbphilharmonie Orchestra.

== History ==
The forerunner organization, die Philharmonische Gesellschaft (The Philharmonic Society), was founded on 9 November 1828, and was led by Friedrich Wilhelm Grund. In 1905, Gustav Mahler conducted the Hamburg premiere of his Symphony No. 5.

In 1934 it merged with the Stadttheater-Orchester to become the Philharmonisches Staatsorchester Hamburg. Under this name a celebrated Eighth Symphony of Anton Bruckner under Eugen Jochum in 1949 was recorded.

== Chief conductors ==
Die Philharmonische Gesellschaft (1828)

- 1828–1862: Friedrich Wilhelm Grund
- 1867–1895: Julius von Bernuth (1830–1902)

Vereins Hamburgischer Musikfreunde (1896)

- 1908–1921: José Eibenschütz
- 1904–1922: Max Fiedler
- 1922–1933: Karl Muck

Philharmonisches Staatsorchester Hamburg (1934)

- 1934–1949: Eugen Jochum
- 1951–1959: Joseph Keilberth, artistic director
- 1961–1973: Wolfgang Sawallisch
- 1973–1976: Horst Stein
- 1976–1982: Aldo Ceccato
- 1984–1988: Hans Zender, GMD
- 1988–1997: Gerd Albrecht, GMD
- 1997–2005: Ingo Metzmacher, GMD
- 2005–2015: Simone Young, GMD
- 2015–2025: Kent Nagano, GMD
- 2025–: Omer Meir Wellber, GMD

=== Honorary conductors ===
- 1967 Karl Böhm
- 2003 Wolfgang Sawallisch
- 2023 Kent Nagano

== See also ==
- Category:Music commissioned by the Hamburg Philharmonic State Orchestra (1)
