= Jesús Arámbarri =

Spanish musician (1902–1960)

Jesús Arámbarri Gárate (13 April 1902 in Bilbao – 11 July 1960 in Madrid) was a Spanish classical music conductor and composer native to the Basque Country.

Jesús Arámbarri has been classed among the cultural treasures of the region, with Juan Crisóstomo Arriaga, Jesús Guridi, Luís de Pablo, Maurice Ravel, and Pablo de Sarasate. His place in 20th-century classical music is part of a tradition which also includes Isaac Albéniz, José Antonio de Donostia, Manuel de Falla, Felipe Pedrell, Joaquín Rodrigo, Joaquín Turina, and José María Usandizaga.

After his early music education at the Bilbao Conservatory of Music, Arámbarri's teachers included Paul Le Flem, Paul Dukas and Vladimir Golschmann in Paris and Felix Weingartner in Basel.

Arámbarri composed some of his most important works while he was a student. After his return to Bilbao he was primarily a conductor and composed only a few more works, which included In memoriam for Juan Carlos de Gortázar (1939), Ofrenda (Offering) for Manuel de Falla (1946), and Dedicatoria (Dedication) for Javier Arisqueta (1949).

From 1933 in Bilbao, Arámbarri conducted the (then part-time) Bilbao Symphony Orchestra, which he developed into the first full-time civic orchestra in Spain. He also arranged musical activities throughout the country and conducted large-score choral works with Basque choirs in Northern Spain. He was a professor at the Madrid Royal Conservatory, a conductor of the Madrid Symphony Orchestra, and served as president of the Spanish Conductors' Association. In 1953, he was appointed conductor of the Banda Sinfónica de Madrid, which had been founded in 1909.

Jesús Arámbarri died in 1960 at the Parque del Buen Retiro while conducting the Banda Sinfónica de Madrid in concert.

== Selected recordings ==
- Jesus Arambarri 8 Basque songs Itxaro Mentxaka (soprano), Bilbao SO, Juan José Mena. Naxos
