= OP50 =

OP50 may refer to:

- Op. 50 (disambiguation), several opuses
- a strain of Escherichia coli used for maintenance of Caenorhabditis elegans cultures
