= Op. 90 =

In music, Op. 90 stands for Opus number 90. Compositions that are assigned this number include:

- Beethoven – Piano Sonata No. 27
- Brahms – Symphony No. 3
- Dvořák – Piano Trio No. 4
- Klebe – Die Fastnachtsbeichte
- Mendelssohn – Symphony No. 4
- Schubert – Impromptus
- Schumann – 6 Gedichte und Requiem
- Sibelius – Six Runeberg Songs, collection of art songs (1917)
