= A New Dawn in the Negev =

Bedouin-Jewish NGO based in Rahat, Israel

- Founded: 2009
- Legal status: NGO
- Purpose: Bedouin youth-at-risk
- Headquarters: Neighbourhood 17, Rahat, Israel
- Location: Rahat, Israel
- Region served: Israel
- Executive Director: Jamal Alkirnawi
- Website: anewdawninthenegev.org

A New Dawn in the Negev is a Bedouin-Jewish co-existence NGO that provides programming for Bedouin youth-at-risk. It is based in Rahat, the only Bedouin city in Israel. Over 600 Bedouin youth aged 5–18 per year participate in their programs.

New Dawn was founded by Jamal Alkirnawi, a Bedouin social worker who worked for Ben Gurion University as an academic counsellor for Arab students.

In 2009, Alkirnawi established New Dawn to empower Bedouin youth, offering English, Hebrew, IT and music classes, and providing opportunities to meet people and cultures outside of their own communities. The organisation is very diverse, with Arab and Jewish Israelis on the Board, Christian, Jewish and Muslim volunteers, and international volunteers from the UK, America, France, Czech Republic, Germany and Canada.

New Dawn also uses its programs to promote Bedouin life, culture and issues to potential tourists and visitors to Rahat. In February 2017, a delegation of 35 politicians and law-makers from the German Bundestag met with New Dawn and other Bedouin NGOs to discuss life in the Negev and the residents' struggle for social rights and political recognition of the nearby unrecognised Bedouin villages.

== Background ==
The Negev Bedouin were traditionally pastoral nomadic Arab tribes living in the Negev region in Israel. From 1858 during Ottoman rule, the Negev Bedouin underwent a process of sedentarization which accelerated after the founding of Israel. In the 1948 Arab–Israeli War, most resettled in neighbouring regions. Between 1968 and 1989, Israel built seven townships in the northeast of the Negev for the Bedouin population, with about half of them relocating to these areas. The process of sedentarization is full of hardships for any nation, since it means a shift from one way of life to another – a transition from wandering to permanent residence, and Bedouin whose society is based on tradition are no exception. As a result of rapid and unexpected changes of the social infrastructure, Bedouin faced many difficulties, primarily related to the integration issues.

The rate of unemployment remains high in Bedouin townships, as well as the crime level. School through age 16 is mandatory by law, but the vast majority of the population does not receive a high school education. Women are discriminated against in the patriarchal-type Bedouin society. There is another serious problem of trespassing on state lands and building of unrecognized Bedouin settlements, which have no municipal status and face demolition orders.

According to the Israeli Central Bureau of Statistics, in 2001 the ethnic make-up of the city was almost completely Arab Bedouin, without a significant Jewish population (see also: Population groups in Israel), making it the largest Bedouin settlement in Israel. Members of several Bedouin family clans reside in Rahat: Al-Qrenawi, Tarabin, Al-Huzeil, Al-Tayaha, Al-Azazma, Al-Jubur, Al-Tawarah, Howeitat, and AbuZayed. Rahat's society is considered a young one, as more than half of its residents are under the age of 18. Nevertheless, in December 2009, the town was ranked low (1 out of 10) in socio-economic standing. Only 46.4% of grade twelve students are eligible to graduate from high school. In 2014 the rate of unemployment was 34%, and in 2017 it is 14% mostly thanks to the new industrial park Idan HaNegev.

== Programs ==
A New Dawn in the Negev advocate that education, employment, and leadership are the key elements helping youth and young adults rise out of poverty to become active, engaged citizens in civil society. They provide a variety of programs in these areas with a range of international and national partners.

=== Educational and Employment Initiatives ===
New Dawn's main program is Secure Future for Youth, geared toward youth at risk in the Bedouin community who have dropped out of school. There are separate classes for boys and girls. Projects include employment training, leadership development and social business ventures. English and Hebrew language classes are available to support Bedouin youth to gain further study and employment opportunities in Israel.

Delivered in conjunction with BINA, a large Israeli volunteering and social justice NGO, the Israel Teaching Fellows programme (ITF) offers young Jewish volunteers from all around the world to spend 10 months in Rahat teaching English to Israeli Arab Bedouin youth. The programme allows ITF volunteers to be immersed in the Bedouin culture and community of Israel while creating ties of coexistence between all residents of the Negev.

New Dawn also provides training for non-graduate jobs - the Explore Rahat – Cultural Tourism program trains 15 Bedouin young women as tour guides for groups provided by affiliate organizations such as Taglit - Birthright and Masa Israel. In collaboration with web development company Wix, 40 teenagers have been trained and employed as web developers using the Wix platform throughout Israel.

=== Sarab - Strings of Change ===
In January 2015 Omer Meir Wellber, a renowned Israeli conductor currently with the Raanana Symphonette Orchestra, Jacob Reuven, and Jamal Alkirnawi met together and founded the "Sarab - Strings of change" program. Meaning Oasis in Arabic, Sarab is the first and only music class available in Rahat. Graduates of the program have the opportunity to continue their musical education with the Beersheba Conservatory of Music. Wellber has stated that his long-term goal is to try to record and preserve indigenous Bedouin traditional music.

=== German Youth Exchange ===
Since 2012, in partnership with the German organization Europeans for Peace, and Friends Without Borders, New Dawn has been running a German/Jewish/Arab exchange program. Bedouin Israeli, Jewish Israeli and German youth participate in dialogue circles and field trips to sites of significance to one another's history. The field trips include Holocaust memorial sites in Germany, as well as sites in Rahat and Jerusalem. Often the Jewish and Bedouin youth have never had contact with the other community before.

=== Emotional First Aid Hotline ===
The Emotional First Aid Hotline, in conjunction with Eran, providers of emotional first aid by phone and Internet for groups such as Holocaust survivors, the elderly and IDF soldiers, will launch in October, and is the first of its kind in Arabic and will be available for residents of the Negev. The hotline will provide a safe way to communicate about emergency, personal and communal issues.

== See also ==
- Arab localities in Israel
- Negev Bedouin
- Sedentarization
