= Omer Meir Wellber =

Israeli conductor and composer (born 1981)

- עומר מאיר ולבר
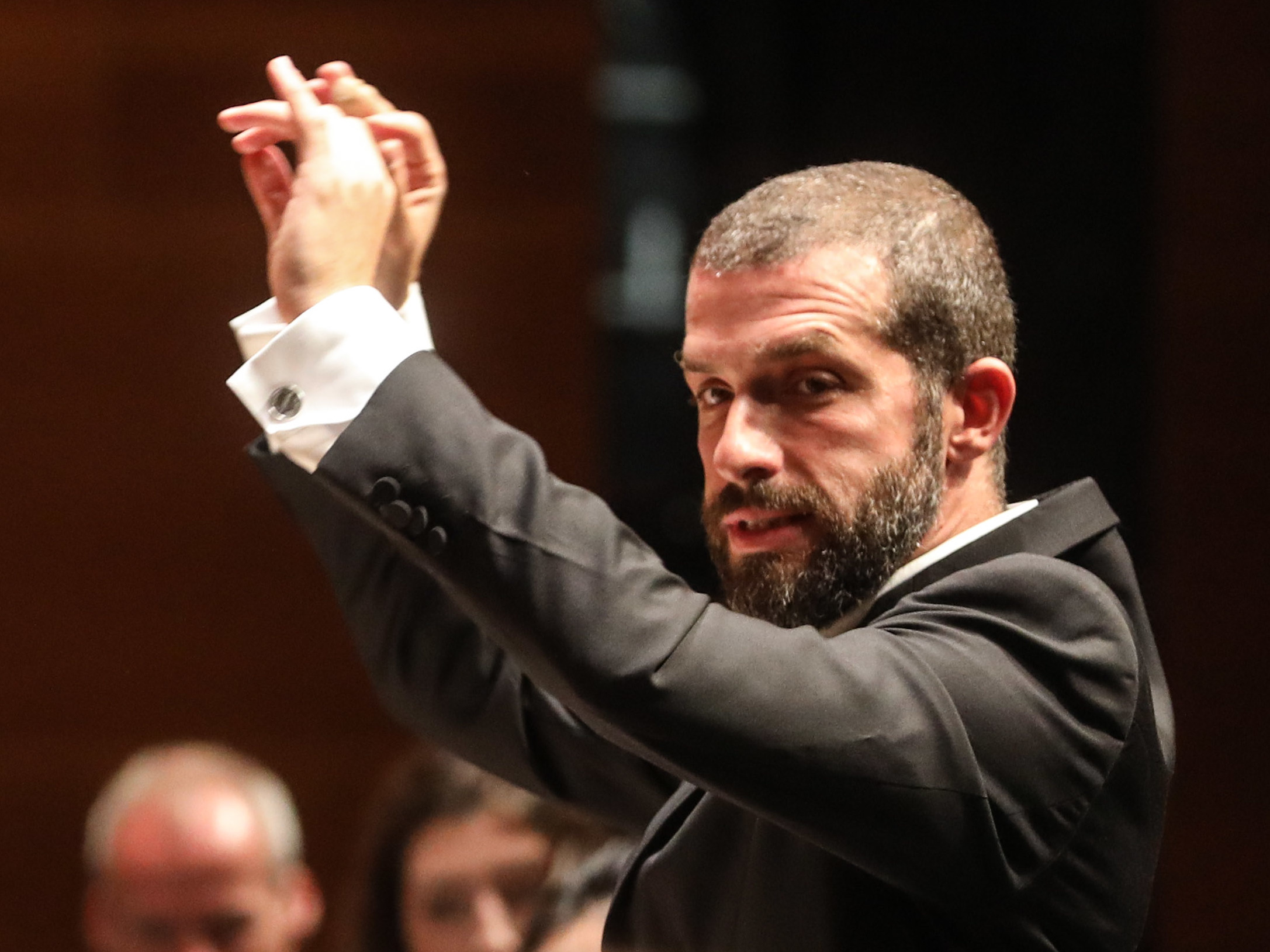
- Wellber in 2019
- Born: 28 October 1981 (age 45); Beersheba, Israel
- Occupations: Conductor and composer
- Organization: Sarab – Strings of Change
- Website: www.omermeirwellber.com

Omer Meir Wellber (Hebrew: עומר מאיר ולבר; born 28 October 1981, Beersheba) is an Israeli conductor and composer.

== Biography ==
Wellber began musical studies at the age of five, on accordion and piano. He became a composition student of Tania Taler at the age of nine. He attended the music conservatory in Be'er Sheva, and graduated from there in 1999. He subsequently studied composition with Michael Wolpe, and continued his studies on a scholarship from the American-Israel Cultural Foundation. He continued his studies with Eugene Zirlin at the Jerusalem Music Academy and in the Mendi Rodan Programme. His compositions include:

- Suite for String Orchestra, Bassoon and Clarinet No. 1
- Mandolin Concerto
- Music for Ten Instruments
- Oboe Quintet (The Last Leaf)
- Viola Concerto

From 2008 to 2010, Wellber was an assistant conductor to Daniel Barenboim at the Staatsoper Unter den Linden and at the Teatro alla Scala in Milan. In 2009, he became music director of the Ra'anana Symphonette Orchestra. From 2011 to 2014, Wellber was music director of the Palau de les Arts Reina Sofia. This appointment was unusual in that Wellber had not conducted with the company prior to his appointment. In 2015, Wellber, Jacob Reuven and the Rahat-based Bedouin nonprofit A New Dawn in the Negev initiated the "Sarab – Strings of change" music education programme.

In March 2018, Wellber first guest-conducted the BBC Philharmonic. On the basis of this appearance, in October 2018, the orchestra announced the appointment of Wellber as its next chief conductor, effective with the 2019–2020 season, with an initial contract of four years. Following his withdrawal from his two scheduled 2022 Proms appearances, Wellber was no longer listed as affiliated with the BBC Philharmonic as of the summer of 2022. In July 2018, the Teatro Massimo di Palermo announced the appointment of Wellber as its next music director, effective January 2020. He became principal guest conductor of the Semperoper Dresden as of the 2018–2019 season. Wellber concluded his Teatro Massimo tenure in 2024.

In December 2020, the Vienna Volksoper announced the appointment of Wellber as its next music director, effective 1 September 2022, with an initial contract of five years. In February 2023, the city of Hamburg announced the appointment of Wellber as its new Generalmusikdirektor (GMD), whose duties include the Hamburg State Opera and the Philharmonisches Staatsorchester Hamburg, effective with the 2025–2026 season. In September 2023, the Vienna Volksoper announced the resignation of Wellber as its music director on 31 December 2023.

Wellber's commercial recordings include Gioia, with Aleksandra Kurzak (Decca), DVD recordings of Eugene Onegin (C Major Entertainment) and of Aida (BelAir Classiques).

Wellber and his family make their home in Milan.

Cultural offices
Preceded by Lorin Maazel	Music Director, Palau de les Arts Reina Sofia; 2011–2014	Succeeded by Roberto Abbado
Preceded by Juanjo Mena	Chief Conductor, BBC Philharmonic; 2019–2022	Succeeded by John Storgårds
Preceded by Gabriele Ferro	Music Director, Teatro Massimo di Palermo; 2020–2024	Succeeded by Diego Matheuz (designate)
Preceded by Leopold Hager	Music Director, Vienna Volksoper; 2022–2023	Succeeded by Ben Glassberg
