= BBC Philharmonic =

BBC symphony orchestra based in Manchester

- Orchestra
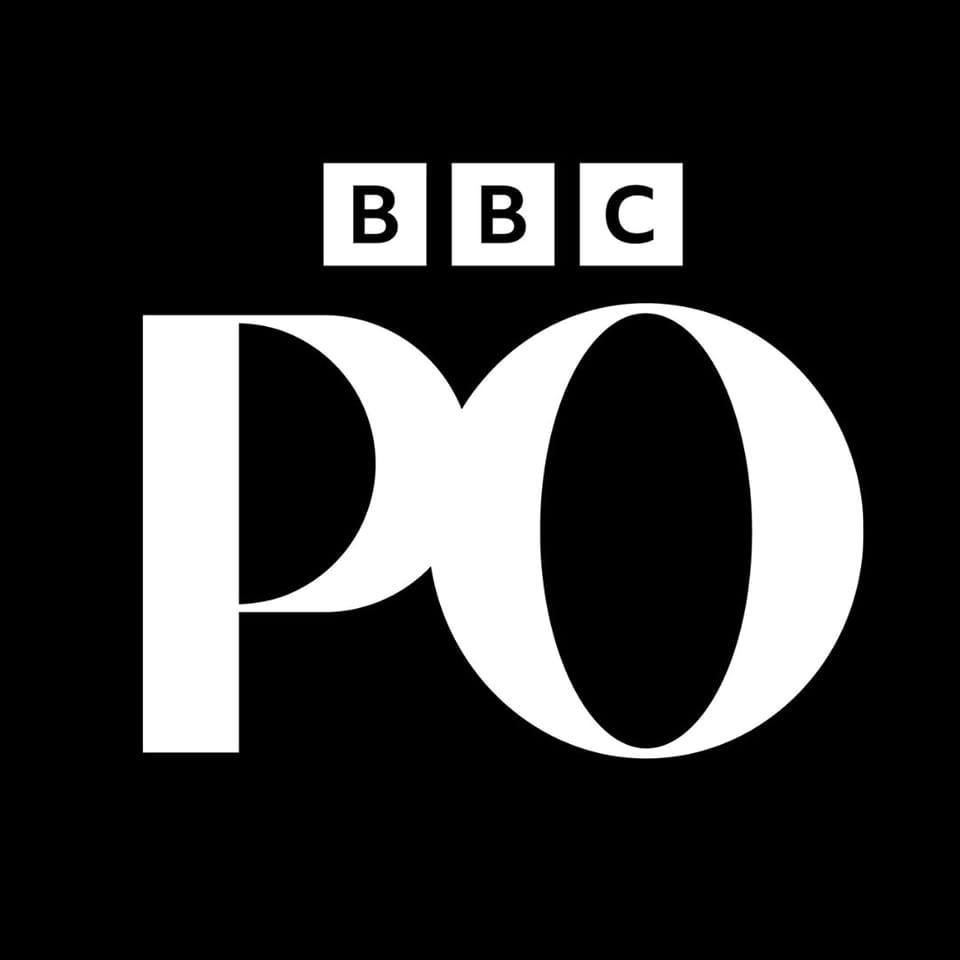
- The BBC Philharmonic Logo
- Former name: 2ZY Orchestra (1922); Northern Wireless Orchestra (1926); Northern Studio Orchestra (1930); BBC Northern Orchestra (1934); BBC Northern Symphony Orchestra (1967)
- Founded: 1922; 104 years ago
- Location: Salford, United Kingdom
- Concert hall: Bridgewater Hall
- Principal conductor: John Storgårds
- Website: Official website

The BBC Philharmonic is a national British broadcasting symphony orchestra and is one of five radio orchestras maintained by the British Broadcasting Corporation. The Philharmonic is a department of the BBC North Group division based at MediaCityUK, Salford. The orchestra's primary concert venue is the Bridgewater Hall, Manchester.

== History ==
The 2ZY Orchestra was formed in 1922 for a Manchester radio station of the same name. It gave the first broadcast performances of many famous English works, including Elgar's Dream of Gerontius and Enigma Variations and Holst's The Planets. The orchestra was part-funded by the British Broadcasting Company (precursor of the BBC), and renamed the Northern Wireless Orchestra in 1926.

When the BBC Symphony Orchestra was established in London in 1930, the new Corporation cut its regional orchestras' funding. The Northern Wireless Orchestra was downsized to just nine players, and renamed the Northern Studio Orchestra.

Three years later, however, the BBC reversed its decision and maintained a full orchestra again – from 1934 it was called the BBC Northern Orchestra. This was the beginning of the orchestra in its present form. In 1946 the orchestra was working with a permanent complement of 50 players, and gave over 70 public concerts during that year, including lunchtime Prom concerts in Manchester Town Hall, at the invitation of the corporation. It rehearsed and broadcast from the Milton Hall, Deansgate, Manchester. The orchestra played at its first Prom in 1961, and regularly gave concerts at the Free Trade Hall, sharing the venue with the Hallé.

On 21 January 1967, the name of the orchestra was changed to the BBC Northern Symphony Orchestra. Following a labour dispute in 1980, the orchestra received a vote of confidence from the BBC in 1982. The BBC expanded the orchestra and changed its name to the BBC Philharmonic Orchestra, or the BBC Philharmonic for short.

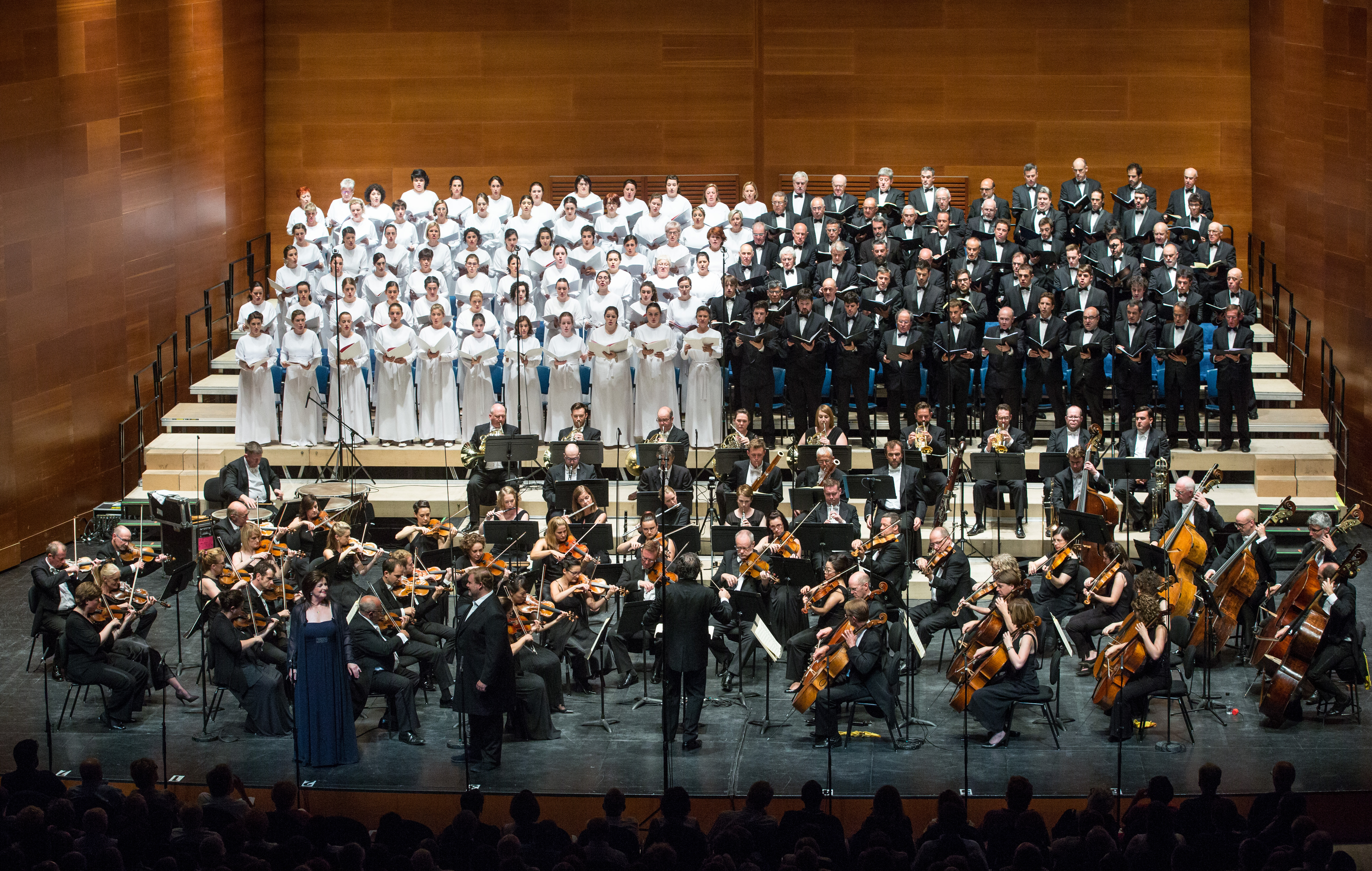
The BBC Philharmonic at the Quincena Musical de San Sebastián in 2017

Yan Pascal Tortelier was principal conductor of the orchestra from 1992 to 2002, and now holds the title of conductor laureate. Gianandrea Noseda became principal conductor of the orchestra in September 2002 and in October 2006 he became chief conductor, with his contract extended through 2010. Noseda concluded his tenure as chief conductor in 2011 and subsequently took the title of conductor laureate along with Tortelier. In July 2010, the orchestra announced the appointment of Juanjo Mena as its next chief conductor, effective with the 2011–2012 season, with an initial contract of three years. Vassily Sinaisky, principal guest conductor of the orchestra from 1996 through January 2012, now has the title of conductor emeritus with the orchestra. In March 2011, the orchestra announced the appointment of John Storgårds as its next principal guest conductor, effective January 2012. In January 2017, the orchestra announced the appointment of Ben Gernon as its next principal guest conductor, as of the autumn of 2017. In parallel, Storgårds took the title of chief guest conductor of the orchestra. Mena concluded his tenure as principal conductor in the summer of 2018.

In March 2018, Omer Meir Wellber first guest-conducted the orchestra and in October that year, was appointed as its next chief conductor, effective with the 2019-2020 season, with an initial contract of 4 years. Following his withdrawal from his two scheduled 2022 Proms appearances, Wellber was no longer listed as affiliated with the BBC Philharmonic as of the summer of 2022. Gernon likewise stood down as the orchestra's principal guest conductor in 2022.

In November 2022, the orchestra named Storgårds its next chief conductor, with immediate effect. Ludovic Morlot currently has the title of artist-in-association with the orchestra. In February 2022, Anja Bihlmaier first guest-conducted the orchestra. Following three subsequent return guest-conducting appearances, in August 2024, the BBC Philharmonic announced the appointment of Bihlmaier as its next principal guest conductor, the first female conductor ever to be named to the post, effective in September 2024, with an initial contract of three seasons. In June 2025, the orchestra announced the extension of Storgårds' contract as its chief conductor to the summer of 2028. In November 2026, the orchestra announced that Storgårds is to conclude his tenure as its chief conductor at the close of the 2027–2028 season and subsequently to take the title of conductor laureate.

Since September 2007, the orchestra has been in a major partnership with Salford City Council, enabling the Orchestra to build links with Salford and its communities. In 2011, the BBC Philharmonic moved to their new dedicated 6,400 sq ft (590 m^{2}) studio at dock10 studios in Media City, Salford Quays, along with a number of other BBC departments that made the move.

In November 2026, the orchestra announced the appointment of Joshua Weilerstein as its next chief conductor, effective in September 2028, with an initial contract of five years.

== Performances ==
Like all BBC performing groups, the orchestra contributes to the schedule of BBC Radio 3. Since 1996, most of the orchestra's live performances have been at the city's Bridgewater Hall, although it frequently tours the UK and internationally.

Whilst not having a formal "composer in residence", since 1991, the orchestra has appointed major composers to collaborate in programs of contemporary music, including Peter Maxwell Davies, James MacMillan, and HK Gruber. In more recent years, the orchestra has collaborated with BBC Radio 1 in producing orchestral performance with modern artists, including symphonies with bands Nero, The xx and The 1975.

The BBC Philharmonic has made over 150 recordings, including series of British film music, the music of George Enescu, and Stokowski's Bach transcriptions have been featured, all on the Chandos label.

== Principal conductors ==
- Charles Groves (1944–1951)
- John Hopkins (1952–1957)
- George Hurst (1958–1968)
- Bryden Thomson (1968–1973)
- Raymond Leppard (1973–1980)
- Edward Downes (1980–1991)
- Yan Pascal Tortelier (1992–2002)
- Gianandrea Noseda (2002–2011)
- Juanjo Mena (2011–2018)
- Omer Meir Wellber (2019–2022)
- John Storgårds (2022–present)
