= Erik Nielsen (conductor) =

American conductor

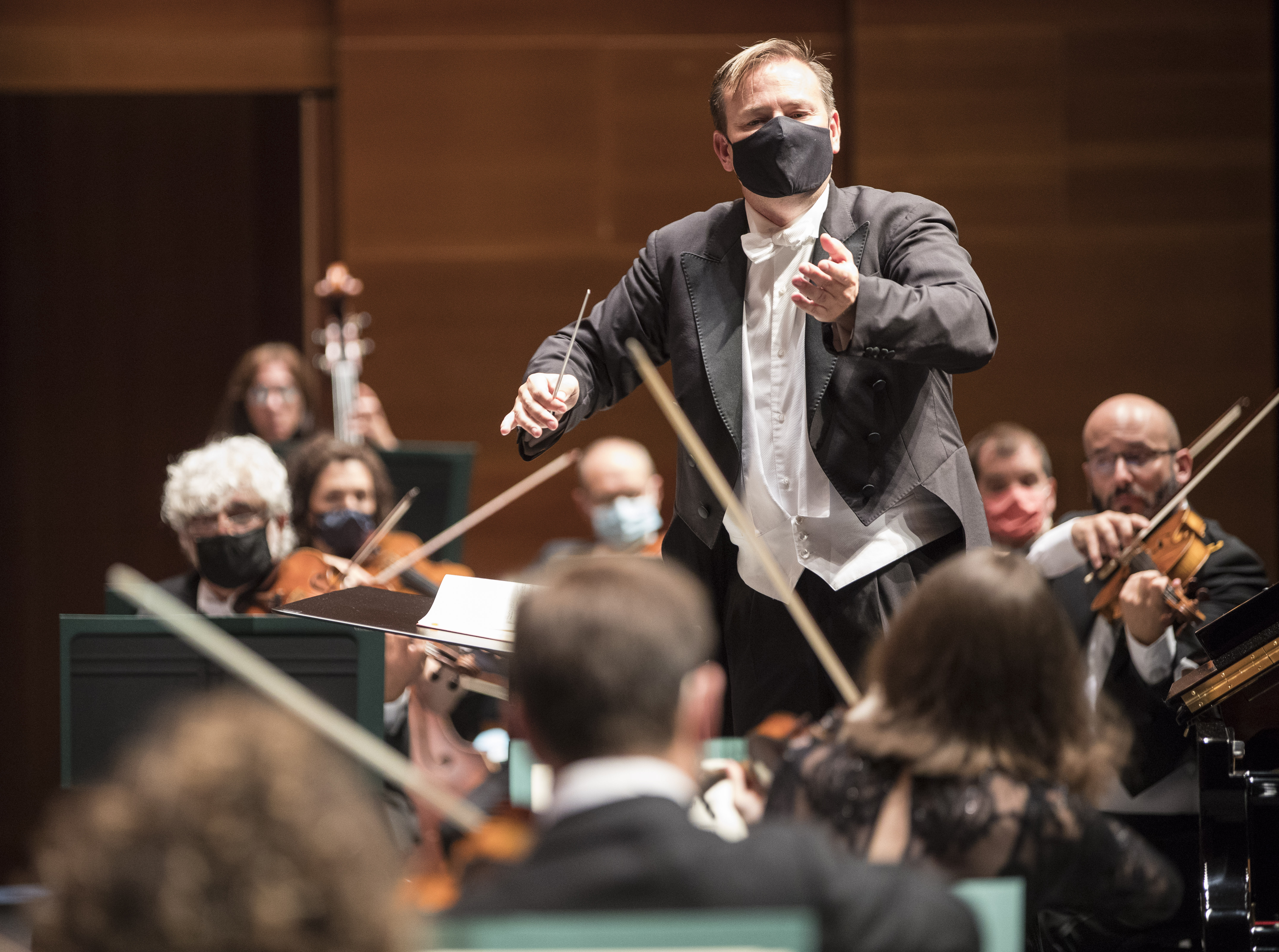
Erik Nielsen, 2020

Erik Nielsen (Iowa, 1977) is an American conductor. Nielsen studied harp at Juilliard School, then conducting at Curtis Institute of Music, Philadelphia. He was Kapellmeister of Frankfurt Opera from 2008 to 2012, and was appointed chief conductor of the Bilbao Symphony Orchestra in 2015. Nielsen conducted the world premiere of Dai Fujikura's opera-oratorio Solaris at the Théâtre des Champs-Élysées in 2015.
