= Conservatory Jesús Guridi =

Music academy in Vitoria-Gasteiz, Spain

Jesús Guridi music conservatory
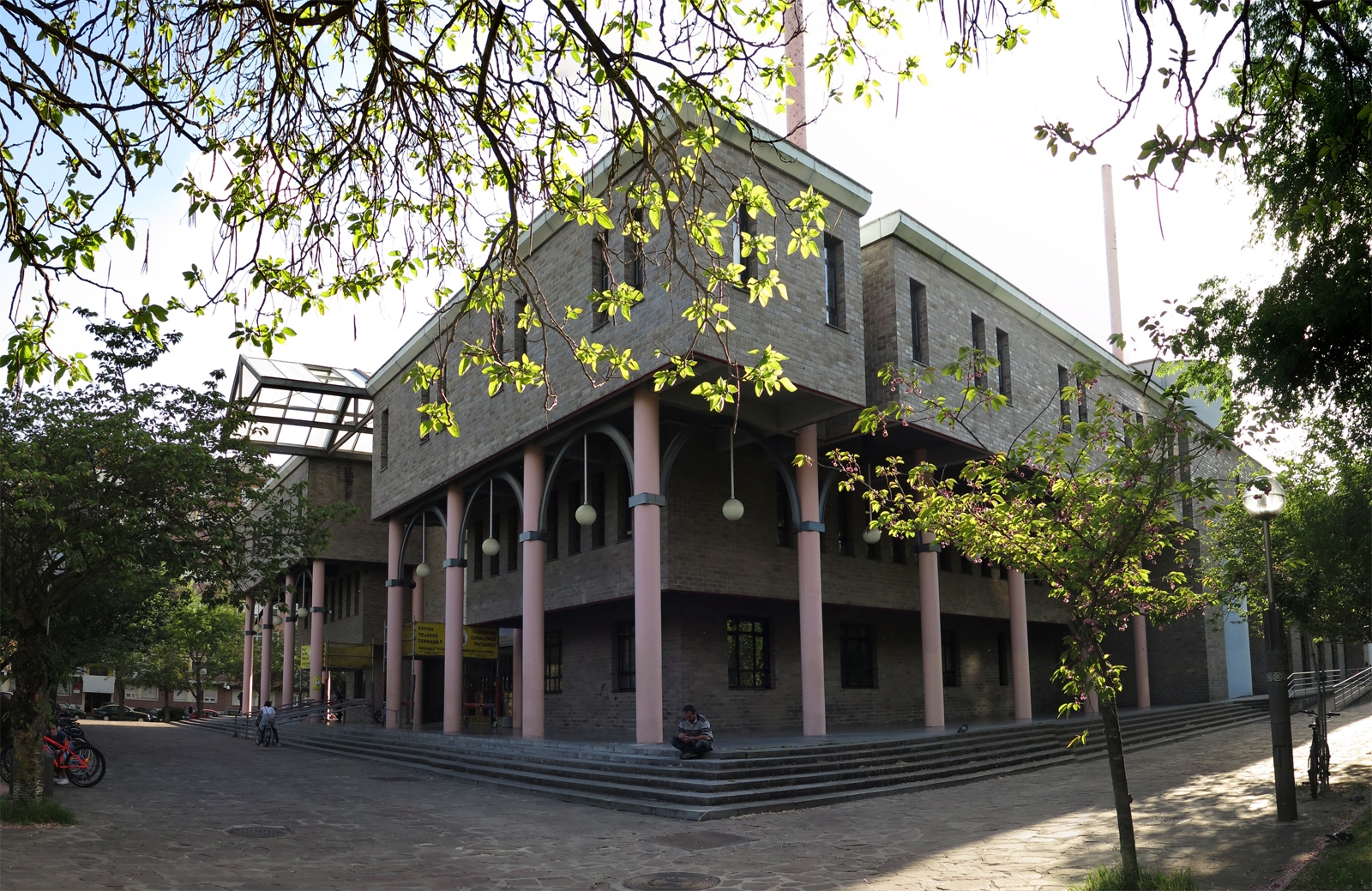
- Interactive map of the Jesús Guridi music conservatory area

General information
- Location: Vitoria-Gasteiz, Spain
- Coordinates: 42.8559°N 2.6814°W

Website
- web.archive.org/web/20120323014232/http://www.conservatoriovitoria.com/new/es/index.php

Conservatorio Jesús Guridi is a music academy in Vitoria-Gasteiz, Spain. It is called Jesús Guridi due to the famous Basque musician who was born in Vitoria-Gasteiz (Vitoria, Spain, 25 September 1886 – Madrid, 7 April 1961). The conservatory is located in Vitoria-Gasteiz, capital of the Autonomous Community of the Basque Country. With a population of 220.000 citizens, the city has a very big cultural dynamism and a particular interest at the moment of offering different artistic and cultural activities. That is why the city contains a large number of museums and a complete programming of cultural events during the whole year, organized by the public institutions and the private leadership. Actually Jesús Guridi music conservatory occupies a very important place in the cultural life of the city.

== History ==
Old conservatory

The Vitoria-Gasteiz city council built the municipal music academy in 1928. It was officially recognised by The General Direction of the Fine Arts department in 1935. In 1980, Carmelo A.Bernaola, a well-known melodist, was appointed as Director. A new building was commenced to house the music academy, which was completed in 1984. The Advanced Degree was recognised in 1990. Six years later the academy changed its name from Escuela Superior de Música (Advanced music school) to Conservatorio Superior de Música (Advanced music conservatory).During the last few years due to the development of the conservatory, the Culture Ministry recognized all the effort by rewarding the music academy with a silver medal that represented the merit of fine arts.

== Facilities ==
Jesús Guridi music academy has nine different departments inside the building.

- Pianists department
- Chamber Music, Singing, Choir and Orchestra department
- Key Department
- Percussion and Accordion department
- Brass department
- Woodwind department
- String department
- Composition department
- Music Theory department

In each department there are more than two teachers that work together. All the departments are equipped with all the musical instruments, electronic devices and different tools that are needed.

Also there is a lounge room on the first floor in front of secretary that leads the way to the elevator that it is used to go to the different departments that are separated in two floors and around 20 classrooms.

The most important room in the entire conservatory is the concert hall which is on the first floor. It is used to perform different culture shows apart from the concerts that are performed weekly by the conservatory students or even other musicians from other academies. Nowadays the conservatory offers concerts in civic centers just as another way of offering music to all the people and gaining experience for their students.

== Electroacoustic laboratory ==
The electroacoustic music laboratory was created in 1985 in a classroom of the conservatory. The construction of the laboratory was the first step in the incorporation of the electroacoustic music in composition and instrumentation classes, being one of the most pioneer conservatories in the country (Spain) due to the installed system that worked with the informatics and electronic music in their studies setup. Impulsed by the melodist Carmelo Bernaola, which was the conservatory director in 1985, the electroacoustic laboratory was designed by Eduardo Bautista and nowadays is directed by Alfonso García de la Torre.

Its activities are focused on the production of electroacoustic pieces and the participation in several concerts.

== Location ==
Álava. the province where Vitoria-Gasteiz (its capital) is located

Jesús Guridi music conservatory is located in the avenue of Vitoria-Gasteiz which is one of the most important transited spot of the city. The building is surrounded by a park with gardens, bushes and trees that make it look more aesthetic which also helps to share the idea of being green that Vitoria-Gasteiz wants to spread.

There are several ways to get to the conservatory. The most used one is the car but it is possible to take the public transport such as the tram, the bus or even the bicycle that can be taken in all of the civic centers which are extended all over the city.

== Displayed activities and concerts ==
- Exchanges and competitions
- MUSIKENE ORCHESTRA
- Courses and seminars at the Conservatory
- Special concerts
- Pedagogical Concerts
- Concerts by students
- INTERNATIONAL MUSIC COURSE
- St. Cecilia Concert, Christmas, Spring, Senior Year and European Music Day
- SOLOISTS OF CONSERVATORY & MUNICIPAL BAND
- CONCERT trio Carles Benavent
- Conservatory Big Band Concert
- Arturo Serra Quartet CONCERT
- Nika Bitchiashvili CONCERT Trio
- CONCERT Trio Paul Gutierrez
- Chano Dominguez Trio Concert
- CONCERT - DECEMBER
- TRIO CONCERT MOZART DELOITTE
- CONCERT Jose Ramon Garcia, piano
- SINKRO FESTIVAL 2011
- CONCERT TRIBUTE TO GURIDI
- TUESDAY 20 MARCH MUSICAL
- TEACHING CONCERTS 2012
- MAIN CHAMBER CYCLE
- CONCERT by conservatory students
- FESTIVAL SINKRO.12
