= Andrés Isasi =

Basque composer

Andrés Isasi Linares (1890 in Bilbao – 1940) was a Spanish composer. He studied with Engelbert Humperdinck in Germany and was better known there than in Spain. He was made a citizen of honour of Getxo district of Greater Bilbao.

== Recordings ==
- Spanish Classics — Andrés Isasi Symphony No. 2 Suite No. 2 Bilbao Symphony Orchestra, Juan José Mena Naxos
- Andrés Isasi : String Quartets : Volumes 1,2,3. Isasi Quartet. Naxos
- Isasi: Orchestral Works: Berceuse Tragica for Violin and Orchestra Op.22 No.1. Erotic Poem Op.14. Zharufa Op.12. El Oráculo Op. 18. El Pecado Op.19 John Carney (violin) Basque National Orchestra, Enrique Garcia Asensio. Claves.
- Songs on Basque songs Carlos Mena. HMF
