= Op. 50 =

In music, Op. 50 stands for Opus number 50. Compositions that are assigned this number include:

- Beethoven – Romance for violin and orchestra no. 2 Op. 50
- Brahms – Rinaldo
- Braunfels – Der Traum ein Leben
- Britten – Billy Budd
- Chopin – Mazurkas, Op. 50
- Eisler – Deutsche Sinfonie
- Elgar – In the South (Alassio)
- Fauré – Pavane
- Haydn – String Quartets, Op. 50
- Hindemith – Konzertmusik for Brass and String Orchestra
- Holst – The Wandering Scholar
- Kabalevsky – Piano Concerto No. 3
- Kienzl – Don Quixote
- Krenek – Das geheime Königreich
- Myaskovsky – Symphony No. 20
- Nielsen – Symphony No. 5
- Prokofiev – String Quartet No. 1
- Schumann – Paradise and the Peri
- Sibelius – Six Songs, Op. 50, collection of art songs (1906)
- Strauss – Feuersnot
- Strauss – Klange aus der Walachei
- Tchaikovsky – Piano Trio
- Villa-Lobos – Cello Concerto No. 1
- Waterhouse – Bei Nacht
