= Rafael Frühbeck de Burgos =

Spanish conductor and composer

- Frühbeck de Burgos conducting the Los Angeles Philharmonic in 2012
- Born: Rafael Frühbeck; 15 September 1933; Burgos, Spanish Republic
- Died: 11 June 2014 (aged 80); Pamplona, Kingdom of Spain
- Occupations: Principal conductor of the Bilbao Orkestra Sinfonikoa, Spanish National Orchestra, Berlin Radio Symphony Orchestra, RAI National Symphony Orchestra, Danish National Symphony Orchestra
- Years active: 1958–2014

Rafael Frühbeck de Burgos (born Rafael Frühbeck; 15 September 1933 – 11 June 2014) was a Spanish conductor and composer. Frühbeck was born in Burgos, Spain to a family of German ancestry. He first took up conducting while on military service in the Spanish Army before graduating from the Hochschule für Musik in Munich. Frühbeck was principal conductor of various orchestras around the world, starting with the Bilbao Symphony Orchestra from 1958 to 1962, then moving on to the Spanish National Orchestra, Yomiuri Nippon Symphony Orchestra of Tokyo and many others. Throughout his career Frühbeck de Burgos recorded on a number of labels. He was a member of the Academy of Fine Arts and History Institución Fernán González. His honours include the 2011 Conductor of the Year award from Musical America.

== Early life ==
Born in Burgos, Spain, Frühbeck came from a family of German ancestry. His father had been wounded in World War I, and during his employment after the war for the Spanish section of a German company, decided to settle in Spain in order to reduce the need to travel. He then sent for his fiancée in Germany, and the couple reunited in Spain. Frühbeck's mother introduced him to the violin, and he had become concertmaster of the local orchestra by age 14. As a youth, he continued violin studies, along with piano, and composition, at the conservatories of Bilbao and Madrid. He first took up conducting while on military service in the Spanish Army. He graduated summa cum laude from the Hochschule für Musik in Munich in conducting and won the Richard Strauss Prize.

== Career ==
Frühbeck was principal conductor of the Bilbao Symphony Orchestra from 1958 to 1962. During this time, the orchestra's manager persuaded Frühbeck to use a name that would more clearly indicate his Spanish identity. He subsequently took the professional surname Frühbeck de Burgos as his artist's name, to include the name of his birth city. He served as principal conductor of the Spanish National Orchestra from 1962 to 1978.

Outside Spain, Frühbeck de Burgos served as Generalmusikdirektor of the Düsseldorf Symphony Orchestra (1966–1971), music director of the Rundfunkorchester Berlin, the Deutsche Oper Berlin, artistic director of the Montreal Symphony Orchestra and chief conductor of the Vienna Symphony. He also was principal guest conductor for various orchestras in Europe, Japan, and the United States, including the National Symphony Orchestra of Washington, DC, from 1980 to 1988. He made his American debut with the Philadelphia Orchestra in February 1969. From 1980 to 1983, he was principal conductor of the Yomiuri Nippon Symphony Orchestra of Tokyo.

From 2001 to 2007, Frühbeck de Burgos was principal conductor of the RAI National Symphony Orchestra. He was music director of the Dresden Philharmonic from 2004 to 2011. In January 2011, the Cincinnati Symphony Orchestra announced the appointment of Frühbeck de Burgos as the Creative Director of its Masterworks Series of concerts, starting with the 2011–12 season. He held the post for two seasons, from 2011 to 2013.

== Later life ==
In February 2011, the Danish National Symphony Orchestra announced the appointment of Frühbeck de Burgos as its principal conductor, as of the 2012–2013 season, with an initial contract of three years through 2015. However, on 4 June 2014, he resigned as chief conductor of the orchestra, with immediate effect. In parallel, Frühbeck de Burgos announced his retirement from conducting and that he had cancer. His final concert as a conductor had been in Washington, DC, on 14 March 2014, with the National Symphony Orchestra.

Frühbeck de Burgos died on 11 June 2014 in Pamplona, Spain. He was buried in his home town of Burgos. He was survived by his wife, María del Carmen Martínez de Frühbeck, whom he married in 1959, and his two children, Rafael Frühbeck Martínez and Gema Frühbeck Martínez.

== Recognition ==
Frühbeck de Burgos recorded on a number of labels, where his recordings include Felix Mendelssohn's Elijah, Paulus the Mozart Requiem, Carl Orff's Carmina Burana, and Georges Bizet's Carmen. He was known as well for his recording of the complete works of Manuel de Falla and a series of complete zarzuela recordings. Frühbeck orchestrated a suite from Isaac Albéniz's Suite española and conducted the New Philharmonia Orchestra in a commercial recording of this arrangement. His work in contemporary music included conducting the world premiere production of Gian Carlo Menotti's opera Goya. He was a member of the Academy of Fine Arts and History Institución Fernán González. His honours include the 2011 Conductor of the Year award from Musical America.

Cultural offices
Preceded by Jean Martinon	Generalmusikdirektor, Düsseldorfer Symphoniker; 1966–1971	Succeeded by Henryk Czyż
Preceded by Jesús López Cobos	Generalmusikdirektor, Deutsche Oper Berlin; 1992–1997	Succeeded by Christian Thielemann
Preceded by (no predecessor)	Principal Conductor, RAI National Symphony Orchestra; 2001–2007	Succeeded by Juraj Valčuha
Preceded by Thomas Dausgaard	Principal Conductor, Danish National Symphony Orchestra; 2012–2014	Succeeded by Fabio Luisi
