= Juanjo Mena =

Spanish conductor (born 1965)

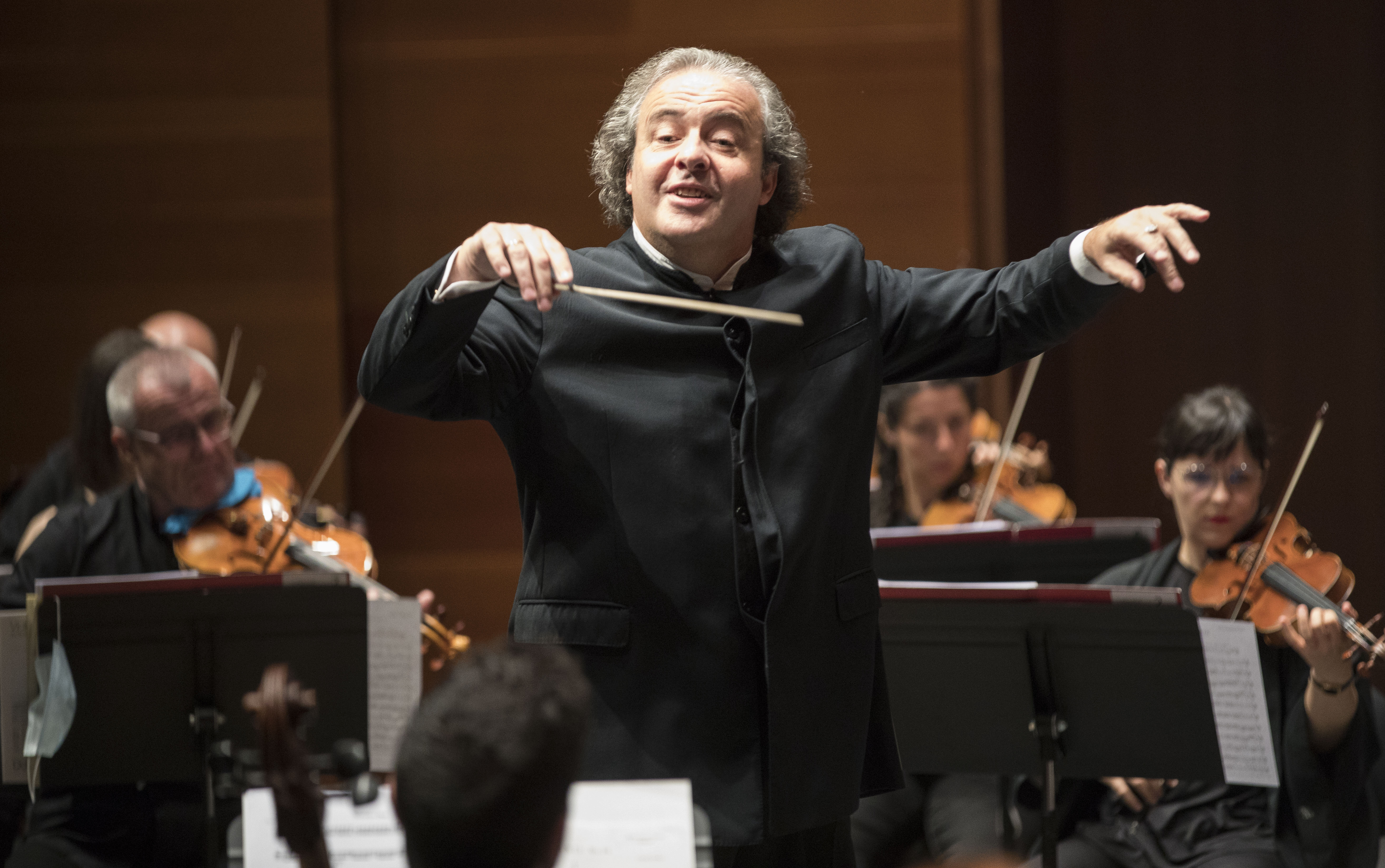
- Born: Juan José Mena; 21 September 1965 (age 60); Vitoria-Gasteiz, Spain
- Occupation: conductor
- Years active: 1997–present
- Website: http://juanjomena.com/

Juanjo Mena (born Juan José Mena; born 21 September 1965) is a Spanish conductor.

== Biography ==
Mena was born in Vitoria-Gasteiz, in the Basque Country. His brother Carlos is a countertenor and his sister Elena is a research chemist. Mena began his music studies at the Vitoria-Gasteiz Conservatory. He later attended the Madrid Royal Conservatory, where his teachers included Carmelo Bernaola (composition and orchestration) and Enrique García Asensio (conducting). He also studied conducting with Sergiu Celibidache in Munich on a Guridi-Bernaola scholarship. In 1997, the Basque Government selected Mena to form the Youth Orchestra of Euskal Herria. He subsequently became associate conductor of the Euskadi Symphony Orchestra.

From 1999 to 2008, Mena was artistic director and principal conductor of the Bilbao Symphony Orchestra. His guest-conducting debut in North America was with the Baltimore Symphony Orchestra in 2004. Mena served as principal guest conductor of the Teatro Carlo Felice, Genoa from 2007 to 2010. He was principal guest conductor of the Bergen Philharmonic Orchestra from 2007 to 2013.

In July 2010, the BBC Philharmonic announced the appointment of Mena as its ninth chief conductor, effective with the 2011–2012 season, with an initial contract of three years, leading twelve concerts per year. Mena directed the BBC Philharmonic in four concerts prior to his appointment. In 2013, Mena extended his contract with the BBC Philharmonic for an additional 3 years. He concluded his tenure as chief conductor of the BBC Philharmonic in the summer of 2018.

In 2016, the Orquesta Nacional de España named Mena its new 'Director Asociado' (principal guest conductor). In October 2016, the Cincinnati May Festival announced the appointment of Mena as its new principal conductor, effective with the 2017–2018 season, with an initial contract of 3 years. Mena stood down as principal conductor of the Cincinnati May Festival in 2023.

In January 2025, Mena announced via social media his diagnosis of early-stage Alzheimer's disease. His recent conducting appearances have included a June 2025 concert at the Granada Festival to mark the 100th anniversary of the revised version of El amor brujo. In March 2026, Mena issued a public statement that his Alzheimer's disease condition has developed to the point where he has decided to conclude his conducting career with his scheduled 2026 engagements.

Mena and his wife Noemi have two children.

== Awards ==
- Premio Nacional de Música, 2016
- Medalla de Oro de Álava, 2017

== Discography ==
With the Bilbao orchestra, he conducted commercial recordings for Naxos Records of music by Jesús Guridi and Andrés Isasi. Mena and the BBC Philharmonic have commercially recorded music of Gabriel Pierné, Manuel de Falla, and of Xavier Montsalvatge for Chandos.

Cultural offices
Preceded by Theo Alcántara	Artistic Director and Principal Conductor, Bilbao Symphony Orchestra; 1999–2008	Succeeded by Günter Neuhold
Preceded by Gianandrea Noseda	Chief Conductor, BBC Philharmonic; 2011–2018	Succeeded by Omer Meir Wellber
Preceded by James Conlon	Principal Conductor, Cincinnati May Festival; 2017–2023	Succeeded by (no successor)
