= Seis canciones castellanas =

Seis canciones castellanas is a collection of 6 songs for voice and piano by Spanish Basque composer Jesús Guridi. They were inspired by traditional songs collected by Cesáreo Garda in Candeleda in 1936 for the movie La malquerida (based on the 1913 play of the same title by Jacinto Benavente). Guridi composed film music, but the Spanish Civil War interrupted the production, and the movie was finished only in 1940.

The collection was performed for the first time on 26 November 1939 in Teatro Coliseo in Bilbao, by Carmen Hernández (mezzo-soprano) and Ricardo Amiano (piano). It also got the first prize on a competition arranged by Delegación de Propaganda y Comisión de Festejos del Aniversario de la Liberación de Bilbao in 1939.

The songs were published by Unión musical Española in 1941. The composer's original manuscript is held at Diputación Foral de Vizcaya.

== List of songs ==
1. Allá arriba en aquella montaña (F minor). Andante con moto — Poco più mosso
2. ¡Sereno! ¡Sereno! (C major). Molto moderato e lugubre
3. Llámale con el pañuelo (A minor). Allegretto grazioso — Meno mosso — Tempo I
4. No quiero tus avellanas (A major). Molto calmo e misterioso
5. Cómo quieres que adivine (G major). Allegro ma non troppo
6. Mañanita de San Juan (D♭ major). Moderato, molto tranquillo
