= Itxaro Mentxaka =

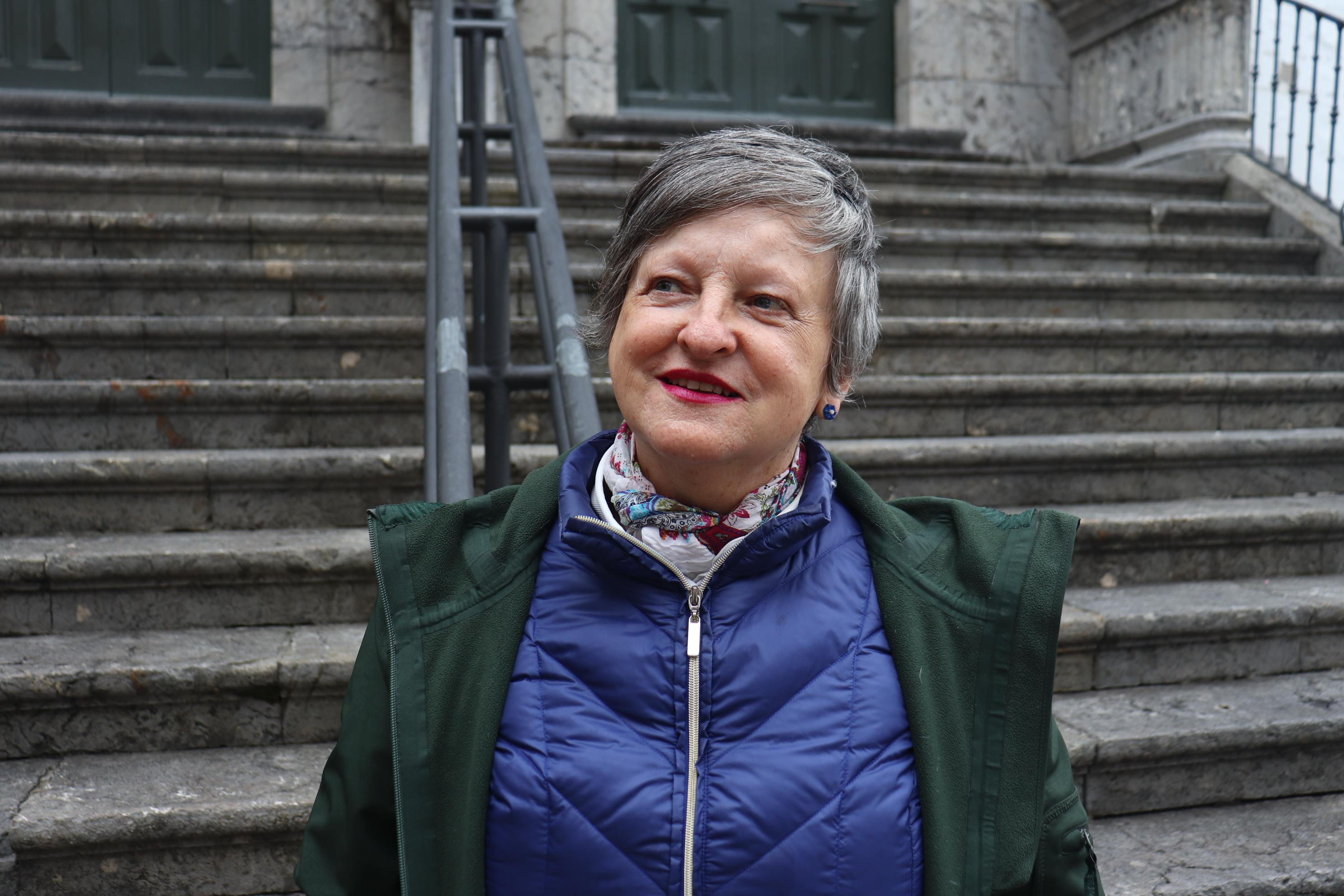
Itxaro Mentxaka

Itxaro Mentxaka Bengoetxea (born 1964 in Lekeitio, Bizkaia, Spain) is a Basque mezzo-soprano.

Her musical career started in her hometown with the Itxas-Soinua Choir. In 1983, she moved to Bourdeaux Conservatoire, where she studied with Monique Florence. Later she continued her studies in Valencia.

She made her operatic debut in the premiere of Leonardo Balada's Cristóbal Colón in the Gran Teatre del Liceu in Barcelona in 1989.

Since then, she has participated regularly in the opera seasons of Barcelona and Madrid, and appears often in Seville, Bilbao, La Coruña, Valencia, Santiago de Compostela, and at the International Festivals of Peralada, Granada and San Sebastian.
