= Castiglia =

Castiglia (Italian: [kaˈstiʎʎa]) is an Italian surname. Notable people with the surname include:

- Albert Castiglia (born 1969), American musician
- Ferdinando Castiglia (died 1521), Italian Roman Catholic bishop
- Francesco Castiglia (1891–1973), later Frank Costello, Italian-American crime boss
- Ivan Castiglia (born 1988), Italian footballer
- Jim Castiglia (1918–2007), American football player
- Luca Castiglia (born 1989), Italian footballer
- Paul Castiglia (born 1966), American comic book writer and editor
- Vincent Castiglia (born 1982), American painter
