= Friedrich Wilhelm Grund =

German composer, conductor and teacher

Friedrich Wilhelm Grund (1791 – 1874) was a German composer, conductor and teacher.

He was born on 7 October 1791 in Hamburg, Holy Roman Empire. He studied with his father (piano, violin, cello and contrabass) and with the Hamburg cantor Christian Friedrich Gottlieb Schwencke. In 1819, he abandoned his career as a concert virtuoso because of the nerve disease of his right hand and he started to compose and teach. In the same year, he co-founded and led the Gesellschaft der Freunde des religiösen Gesangs (later the Hamburger Singakademie). He also co-founded the Hamburger Tonkünstlervereins.

He died 24 November 1874 in Hamburg, German Empire.

== List of selected works ==
- Op. 5 Piano quartet
- Op. 8 Quintet for piano and winds
- Op. 9 Violin sonata
- Op. 11 Sonata for piano and cello or violin
- Op. 13 Grande sonate
- Op. 13 Piano quartet
- Op. 14 Grande polonaise
- Op. 22 Songs
- Op. 23 Grand divertissement
- Op. 25 Introduction et rondeau
- Op. 27 Trio de salon
- Op. 31 Songs for two voices
- Die Burg Falkenstein (romantic opera in 5 acts, Hamburg, 1825)
- Mathilde (heroic opera in 3 acts)
- Caroline Pichler (opera, not performed)
- Die Auferstehung und Himmelfahrt Jesu (oratorio)
- 6 songs after Goethe
