= Theo Alcántara =

Spanish conductor (born 1941)

Theo Alcántara is a Spanish-born conductor of both orchestra and opera, primarily in the United States, South America, and Spain.

== Notable permanent and guest conducting roles ==
Maestro Alcántara has held the following permanent appointments:

- Deputy Director of the Camerata Academica and the Orchestra at the Akademie Mozarteum in Salzburg
- 1964–66, conductor of the Frankfurt Opera, Frankfurt, Germany
- 1967–74, director of the opera workshop and symphony orchestra of the University of Michigan, Ann Arbor, Michigan
- 1968–72, Jackson Symphony Orchestra in Jackson, Michigan
- 1973–78, Western Michigan Opera (now Opera Grand Rapids)
- 1973–78, Grand Rapids Symphony, Grand Rapids, MI
- 1978–89, Phoenix Symphony, Phoenix AZ, and laureate conductor 1989-93
- 1981-84 Artistic Director of the Music Academy of the West, Summer Festival, Santa Barbara, California
- 1987-2002 Pittsburgh Opera
- 1990–93, artistic director of the Caracas Opera and Caracas International Opera Festival
- 1993-2002 Artistic Director of the Bilbao Orkestra Sinfonikoa
- 1994- Principal Guest Conductor of the National Orchestra of Spain

On May 27, 1978, he made his debut with the Metropolitan Opera in New York, conducting Don Giovanni.

He has guest conducted with the Philadelphia Orchestra, American Symphony Orchestra, Baltimore Symphony Orchestra, Columbus Symphony Orchestra, Dallas Symphony Orchestra, the Detroit Symphony Orchestra, Florida Philharmonic Orchestra, Memphis Symphony Orchestra, Puerto Rico Symphony Orchestra, Rochester Philharmonic Orchestra, San Diego Symphony, Seattle Symphony, Utah Symphony, Vancouver Symphony Orchestra, Berlin Radio Symphony Orchestra, the Simón Bolívar Orchestra of Caracas, Venezuela, Copenhagen Radio Orchestra, National Symphony of Mexico, and the Municipal Orchestra of Taipei in a tour of China. He has been invited to conduct at music festivals in Aspen, Grant Park in Chicago, Chautauqua, Meadbrook, Spoleto, and Saratoga Springs.

Maestro Alcántara has conducted a number of the world's major opera companies, including the New York City Opera, the Florida Grand Opera, Washington National Opera, the Mexico City Opera, opera Cristoforo Colombo, Teatro Colón, Buenos Aires, and the International Opera Festival in the Canary Islands.

Maestro Alcántara has recorded for Naxos Records and Marco Polo records.

== Biography ==
Theo Alcantara was born in Cuenca, Castiglia, Spain on April 16, 1941.

He studied in Madrid at the Madrid Royal Conservatory, and obtained a diploma in piano and composition.

He then studied composition and conducting at the Mozarteum in Salzburg, Austria. In 1964, he received lessons from Herbert von Karajan. He graduated with distinction, after serving as principal conductor of the Camerata Academica and Orchestra, and receiving the Lilli Lehmann Medal.

He had his conducting debut at the Teatro de la Zarzuela, Madrid.

He is married to Susan Alcantara and has two children, Rafael and Carlos.

== Recognition ==
Theo Alcantara is recognized as an important orchestra conductor in Marquis Who's Who.

He is listed in Baker's Biographical Dictionary of Musicians, ed. Nicolas Slonimsky

He is listed in Operabase
