= Six Songs, Op. 50 (Sibelius) =

Collection of art songs by Jean Sibelius (1906)

- Song collection by Jean Sibelius
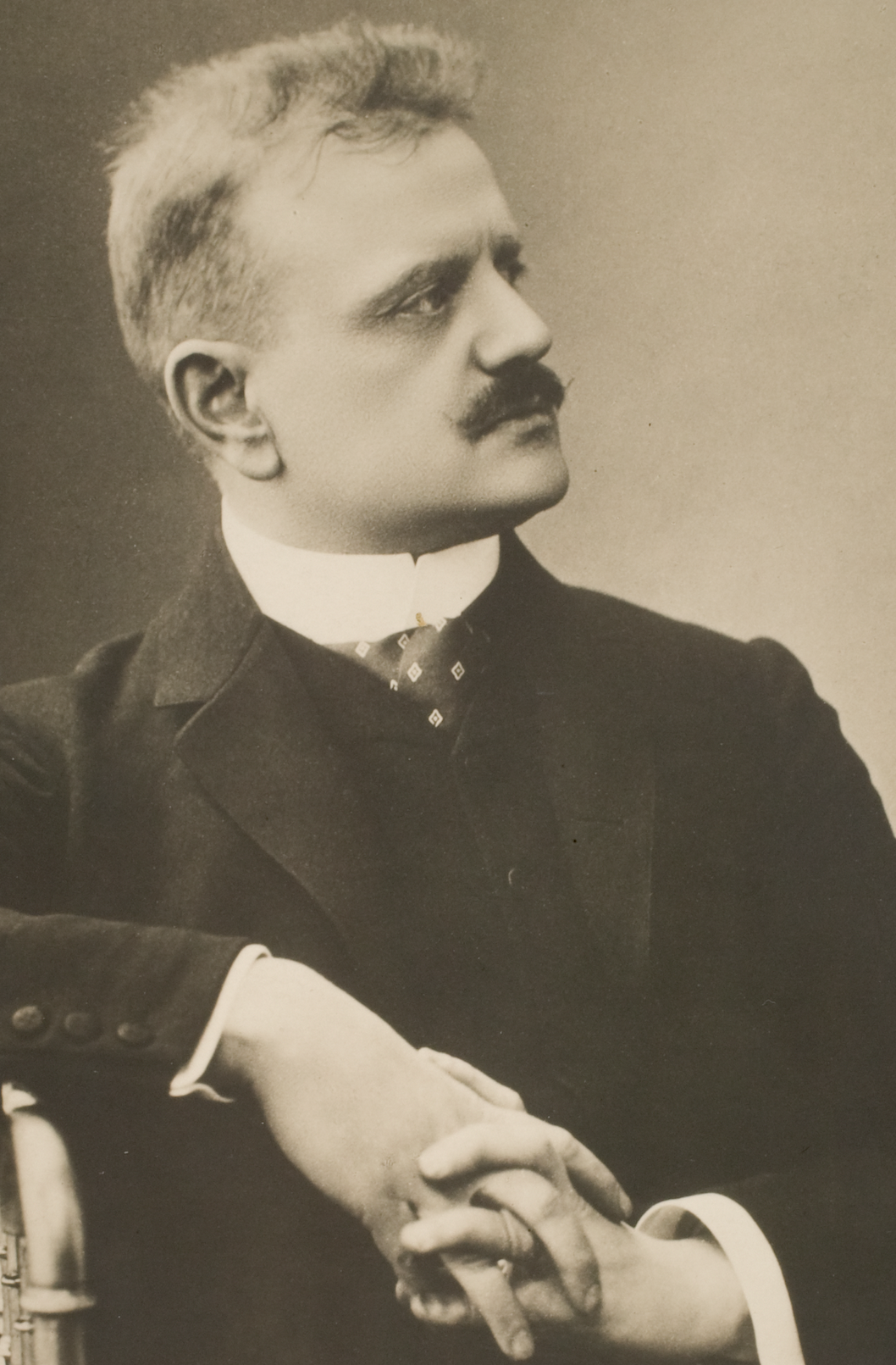
- The composer (c. 1905)
- Opus: 50
- Language: German
- Composed: 1906

External audio
- Sung by Anne Sofie von Otter, accompanied by Bengt Forsberg
- No. 1, "Lenzgesang"
- No. 2, "Sehnsucht"
- No. 3, "Im Feld ein Mädchen singt"
- No. 4, "Aus banger Brust"
- No. 5, "Die stille Stadt"
- No. 6, "Rosenlied"

The Six Songs, Op. 50, (Note: Because Sibelius's Op. 50 songs are sung in German, this article gives preference to each song's native title, rather than the English translation.) is a collection of German-language art songs for vocal soloist and piano written in 1906 by the Finnish composer Jean Sibelius. "Die stille Stadt" ("The Silent City") generally is considered the best of the set.

== Constituent songs ==
Ordered by catalogue number, the Op. 50 songs are as follows:

- "Lenzgesang" ("Spring Song"), Op. 50/1; text by the German poet Arthur Fitger
- "Sehnsucht" ("Longing"), Op. 50/2; text by the German poet Emil Rudolf Weiß
- "Im Feld ein Mädchen singt" ("In the Field a Maid Sings"), Op. 50/3; text by the German-Jewish poet Margarete Susman
- "Aus banger Brust" ("From Anxious Heart"), Op. 50/4; text by the German poet Richard Dehmel
- "Die stille Stadt" ("The Silent City"), Op. 50/5; text by Dehmel
- "Rosenlied" ("Song of the Roses"), Op. 50/6; text by the German poet Anna Ritter

The songs were first published in 1907 by the Berlin-based firm of Robert Lienau. The table below provides additional information about each song:

Song	Tempo	Time	Key	Premiere				Ref.
Song	Tempo	Time	Key	Soloist	Pianist	Date	Venue	Ref.
No. 1	Tempo giusto	common time	G-flat major	—N/a	—N/a	—N/a	—N/a	
No. 2	Comodo	6/8	E major	Ida Ekman	Karl Ekman	26 October 1906	Solemnity Hall, Helsinki	
No. 3	Lento assai	common time	D-flat major	Ida Ekman	Karl Ekman	26 October 1906	Solemnity Hall, Helsinki	
No. 4	Con moto	common time	F major	Maikki Järnefelt	Armas Järnefelt	11 October 1906	Finnish National Theatre	
No. 5	Andantino	cut time	G-flat major	Maikki Järnefelt	Armas Järnefelt	11 October 1906	Finnish National Theatre	
No. 6	Allegretto	3/4	D major	Ida Ekman	Karl Ekman	26 October 1906	Solemnity Hall, Helsinki	

== Notes, references, and sources ==
=== Sources ===
- Barnett, Andrew (2007). Sibelius. New Haven, Connecticut: Yale University Press. ISBN 978-0-300-16397-1.
- Dahlström, Fabian [in Swedish] (2003). Jean Sibelius: Thematisch-bibliographisches Verzeichnis seiner Werke [Jean Sibelius: A Thematic Bibliographic Index of His Works] (in German). Wiesbaden: Breitkopf & Härtel. ISBN 3-7651-0333-0.
- Layton, Robert (1993) [1965]. Sibelius. (The Master Musicians Series) (4th ed.). New York: Schirmer Books. ISBN 0028713222.
