= Six Songs, Op. 36 (Sibelius) =

Collection of art songs by Jean Sibelius (1899–1900)

- Song collection by Jean Sibelius
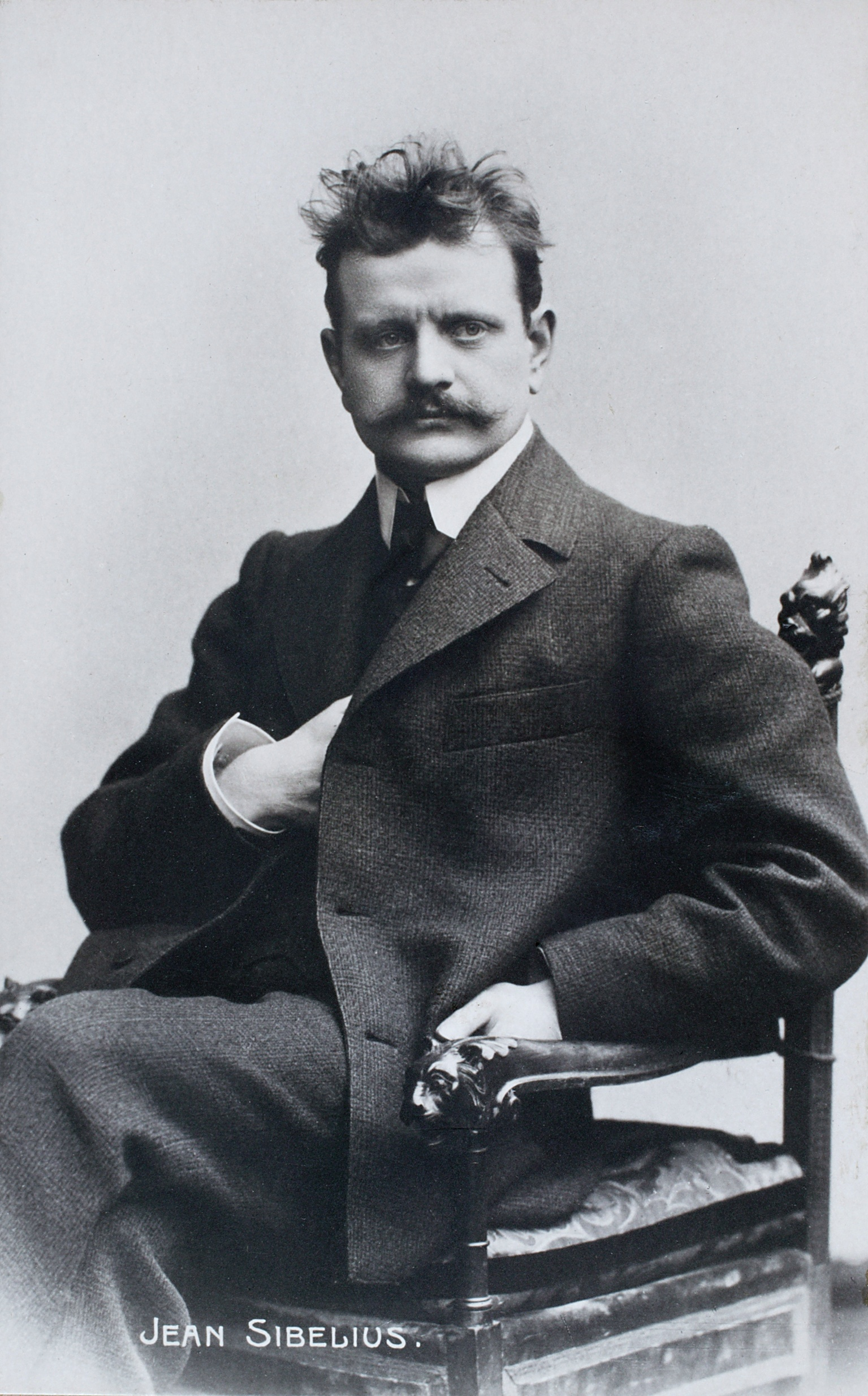
- The composer (c. 1900)
- Opus: 36
- Language: Swedish
- Composed: 1899–1900; No. 6 orch. 1917

External audio
- Sung by Anne Sofie von Otter, accompanied by Bengt Forsberg
- No. 1, "Svarta rosor"
- No. 2, "Men min fågel märks dock icke"
- No. 3, "Bollspelet vid Trianon"
- No. 4, "Säv, säv, susa"
- No. 5, "Marssnön"
- No. 6, "Demanten på marssnön"

The Six Songs, Op. 36, (Note: Because Sibelius's Op. 36 songs are sung in Swedish, this article gives preference to each song's native title, rather than the English translation.) is a collection of Swedish-language art songs for vocal soloist and piano written from 1899 to 1900 by the Finnish composer Jean Sibelius. (Note: All but a few of Sibelius's songs are settings of Swedish-language poems (quantitatively, his favorite poets were Ernst Josephson, Johan Ludvig Runeberg, Viktor Rydberg, and Karl August Tavaststjerna) and are with piano accompaniment. While many are of high quality, they largely have been neglected outside the Nordic realm, due to the limited coverage (in terms of number of speakers) of Swedish (relative to, for example, German or French).) As a group, Op. 36 is Sibelius's most popular song set; indeed, "Svarta rosor" is arguably the best-known song in his entire oeuvre. "Säv, säv, susa", too, is oft-performed.

== Constituent songs ==
Ordered by catalogue number, the Op. 36 songs are as follows:

- "Svarta rosor" ("Black Roses"), Op. 36/1 (1899); text by the Swedish poet Ernst Josephson (Note: "Svarta rosor" is known under several additional titles, including: in Finnish "Mustat ruusut"; in German: "Schwarze Rosen"; and in French: "Roses funèbres".)
- "Men min fågel märks dock icke" ("But My Bird is Long in Homing"), Op. 36/2 (1899); text by the Finnish poet Johan Ludvig Runeberg (Note: "Men min fågel märks dock icke" is known under several additional titles, including: in Finnish "Vaan mun lintuain ei kuulu"; in German: "Doch mein Vogel kehrt nicht wieder"; and in French: "Mon Oiseau ne revient pas".)
- "Bollspelet vid Trianon" ("Tennis at Trianon"), Op. 36/3 (1899); text by the Swedish poet Gustaf Fröding (Note: "Bollspelet vid Trianon" is known under several additional titles, including: in Finnish "Palloleikki Trianonissa"; in German: "Ballspiel in Trianon"; and in French: "Bal à Trianon".)
- "Säv, säv, susa" ("Sigh, Sigh, Sedges"), Op. 36/4 (1900); text by Fröding (Note: "Säv, säv, susa" is known under several additional titles, including: in Finnish "Soi, soi, kaisla"; in German: "Schilfrohr, säus'le"; and in French: "Parle, ô vague". An alternative English translation of the title is "Reed, Reed, Rustle".)
- "Marssnön" ("The March Snow"), Op. 36/5 (1900); text by the Finnish poet Josef Julius Wecksell (Note: "Marssnön" is known under several additional titles, including: in Finnish "Maaliskuun lumi"; and in German: "Märzschnee".)
- "Demanten på marssnön" ("The Diamond on the March Snow"), Op. 36/6 (1900); text by Wecksell (Note: "Demanten på marssnön" is known under several additional titles, including: in Finnish "Timantti hangella"; and in German: "Der Diamant auf dem Märzschnee".)

The collection was first published piecemeal by two Helsinki-based firms: Fazer & Westerlund (Helsingfors Nya Musikhandel) printed Nos. 1–4 from 1900 to 1901, while Axel E. Lindgren printed Nos. 5–6 in 1901. The table below provides additional information about each song:

Song	Tempo	Time	Key	Premiere				Ref.
Song	Tempo	Time	Key	Soloist	Pianist	Date	Venue	Ref.
No. 1	Commodo	common time	A minor	Ida Ekman	Karl Ekman	21 September 1899	Solemnity Hall, Helsinki	
No. 2	Andantino	common time	A minor	Ida Ekman	Karl Ekman	21 September 1899	Solemnity Hall, Helsinki	
No. 3	Vivace	3/4	A major	Ida Ekman	Karl Ekman	24 October 1900	Solemnity Hall, Helsinki	
No. 4	Andantino	2/4	G-flat major	Adée Leander-Flodin	Karl Flodin	Autumn 1900	?	
No. 5	Andantino	5/4	E minor	Ida Ekman	Karl Ekman	12 October 1902	VPK Hall, Helsinki	
No. 6	Commodo	6/4	B-flat major	Alexandra Ahnger	Oskar Merikanto	8 February 1901	Solemnity Hall, Helsinki	

=== Orchestral version of No. 6 ===
In January 1917, Sibelius arranged "Demanten på marssnön" for vocalist and orchestra, which he intended for his frequent collaborator, the celebrated Finnish soprano Ida Ekman; she premiered this version of the song on 22 February 1917 in Helsinki, with her husband, Karl Ekman, conducting the Helsinki Philharmonic Orchestra. It is scored for the following instruments and voices, organized by family (vocalists, woodwinds, and strings):

- Vocalist (typically soprano or baritone)
- 2 flutes and 2 clarinets
- Violins (I and II), violas, cellos, double basses, and harp

The orchestral version of "Demanten på marssnön" was first published in Volume VIII/1 of the Jean Sibelius Works (JSW) critical edition, an ongoing collaborative project involving the National Library of Finland, the German firm of Breitkopf & Härtel, and the Sibelius Society of Finland.

== Notes, references, and sources ==
=== Sources ===
- Barnett, Andrew (2007). Sibelius. New Haven, Connecticut: Yale University Press. ISBN 978-0-300-16397-1.
- Dahlström, Fabian [in Swedish] (2003). Jean Sibelius: Thematisch-bibliographisches Verzeichnis seiner Werke [Jean Sibelius: A Thematic Bibliographic Index of His Works] (in German). Wiesbaden: Breitkopf & Härtel. ISBN 3-7651-0333-0.
- Layton, Robert (1993) [1965]. Sibelius. (The Master Musicians Series) (4th ed.). New York: Schirmer Books. ISBN 0028713222.
