= Six Runeberg Songs =

Collection of art songs by Jean Sibelius (1917)

- Song collection by Jean Sibelius
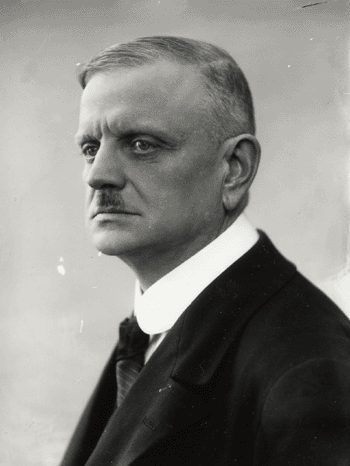
- The composer (c. 1918)
- Opus: 90
- Language: German
- Composed: 1917

External audio
- Sung by Anne Sofie von Otter, accompanied by Bengt Forsberg
- No. 1, "Norden"
- No. 2, "Hennes budskap"
- No. 3, "Morgonen"
- No. 4, "Fågelfängaren"
- No. 5, "Sommarnatten"
- No. 6, "Vem styrde hit din väg?"

The Six Runeberg Songs, Op. 90, (Note: Because Sibelius's Op. 90 songs are sung in Swedish, this article gives preference to each song's native title, rather than the English translation.) is a collection of Swedish-language art songs for vocal soloist and piano written in 1917 by the Finnish composer Jean Sibelius, (Note: All but a few of Sibelius's songs are settings of Swedish-language poems (quantitatively, his favorite poets were Ernst Josephson, Johan Ludvig Runeberg, Viktor Rydberg, and Karl August Tavaststjerna) and are with piano accompaniment. While many are of high quality, they largely have been neglected outside the Nordic realm, due to the limited coverage (in terms of number of speakers) of Swedish (relative to, for example, German or French).) who composed them for his frequent collaborator, the Finnish soprano Ida Ekman. Each song is a setting of a poem by the Finnish poet Johan Ludvig Runeberg, and of the set, "Norden" ("The North") generally is considered the best.

== Constituent songs ==
Ordered by catalogue number, the Op. 90 songs are as follows:

- "Norden" ("The North"), Op. 90/1
- "Hennes budskap" ("Her Message"), Op. 90/2
- "Morgonen" ("The Morning"), Op. 90/3
- "Fågelfängaren" ("The Bird Catcher"), Op. 90/4
- "Sommarnatten" ("Summer Night"), Op. 90/5
- "Vem styrde hit din väg?" ("Who Brought You Hither?"), Op. 90/6

The songs were first published in 1920 by the Helsinki-based firm of R. E. Westerlund. The table below provides additional information about each song:

Song	Tempo	Time	Key	Premiere				Ref.
Song	Tempo	Time	Key	Soloist	Pianist	Date	Venue	Ref.
No. 1	Moderato	3/2	C major	—N/a	—N/a	—N/a	—N/a	
No. 2	Andantino	3/4	A major	—N/a	—N/a	—N/a	—N/a	
No. 3	Allegretto grazioso	common time	F major	—N/a	—N/a	—N/a	—N/a	
No. 4	Allegretto	2/4	B-flat major	Ida Ekman	Karl Ekman	1 October 1919	Solemnity Hall, Helsinki	
No. 5	Commodo	common time	E-flat major	Ida Ekman	Karl Ekman	4 October 1919	Solemnity Hall, Helsinki	
No. 6	Lento ed espressivo	3/2	B-flat major	—N/a	—N/a	—N/a	—N/a	

== Notes, references, and sources ==
=== Sources ===
- Barnett, Andrew (2007). Sibelius. New Haven, Connecticut: Yale University Press. ISBN 978-0-300-16397-1.
- Dahlström, Fabian [in Swedish] (2003). Jean Sibelius: Thematisch-bibliographisches Verzeichnis seiner Werke [Jean Sibelius: A Thematic Bibliographic Index of His Works] (in German). Wiesbaden: Breitkopf & Härtel. ISBN 3-7651-0333-0.
- Layton, Robert (1993) [1965]. Sibelius. (The Master Musicians Series) (4th ed.). New York: Schirmer Books. ISBN 0028713222.
