= Jacob Reuven =

Israeli mandolin player

Jacob Reuven יעקב ראובן
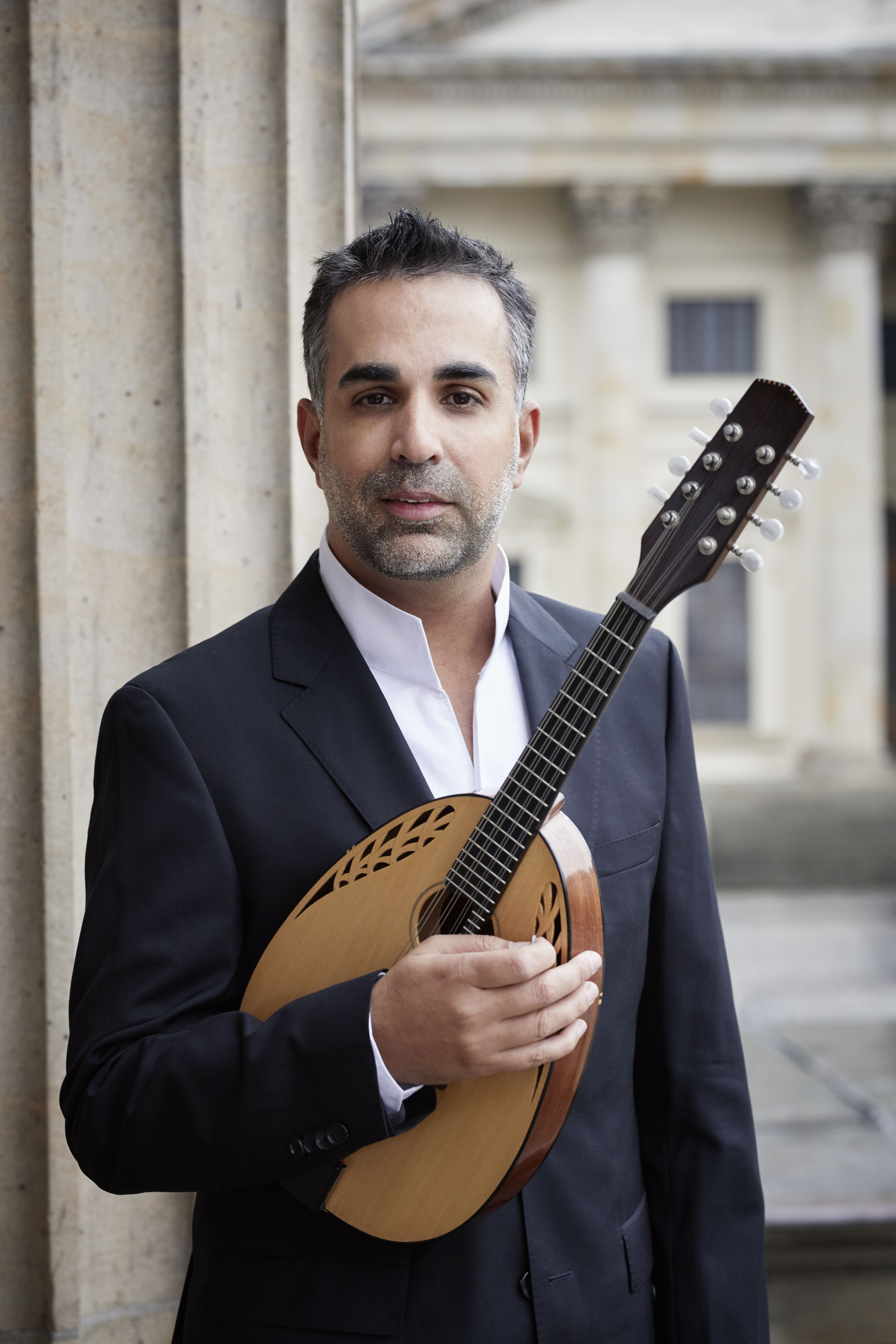

Background information
- Origin: Israel
- Genres: Classical, Baroque, Contemporary, World music
- Occupation: Mandolin player
- Instrument: Mandolin

Jacob Reuven (Hebrew: יעקב ראובן) is an Israeli mandolin player. Reuven's music encompasses classical music, baroque music, contemporary music, world music, and music for modern dance and theatre.

== Biography ==
Reuven began his mandolin studies at the age of eight under the guidance of Prof. Simha Nathanson at the Beer Sheva Music Conservatory. Reuven later studied with Mr. Lev Haimovitch until beginning his studies at the Jerusalem Academy of Music and Dance where he was studied with Prof. Motti Smidt.

Reuven performs as a soloist and as a guest artist with some of the best Israeli orchestras and ensembles including the Israel Philharmonic Orchestra, the Jerusalem Symphony Orchestra, the Israeli Sinfonietta, the Israel Chamber Orchestra and the Twenty First Century Ensemble. Jacob played under the baton of conductors such as Zubin Mehta, Mstislav Rostropovitch, Antonio Pappano, Mendi Rodan and Zsolt Nagy.

Reuven has collaborated with the Jerusalem Quartet and the Vivace Ensemble, among others. He is a member of the award-winning Kerman Mandolin Quartet as well as a member of Barrocade: the Israel Baroque Collective, with whom he often performs as soloist.

Reuven has been invited to perform with orchestras such as The Orquestra de la Comunitat Valenciana, and be a leading artist in festivals including the Festival Mandolines de Lunel. Those are among other recitals and festivals abroad (mostly Europe).

During his studies Reuven had won twice the academy's prestigious Concerto Competition, which marked the beginning of his career, and In 2004, Reuven won first prize in the distinguished International Plectro Rioja competition in Spain and has become internationally known.

Reuven is the first mandolin player to perform violin repertoire on mandolin with an Israeli orchestra. His performances to this repertoire have given him his well-known name in Israel and abroad.

== Discography ==
Hebrew Mandolin – Jacob Reuven and Raanana Symphonette Orchestra

Sources-Mandolin duo – Jacob Reuven and Alon Sariel

Vivaldolino – Jacob Reuven and Barrocade Ensemble

Music from the Promised Land https://www.naxos.com/catalogue/item.asp?item_code=8.573962
