= Jesús Guridi =

Spanish composer

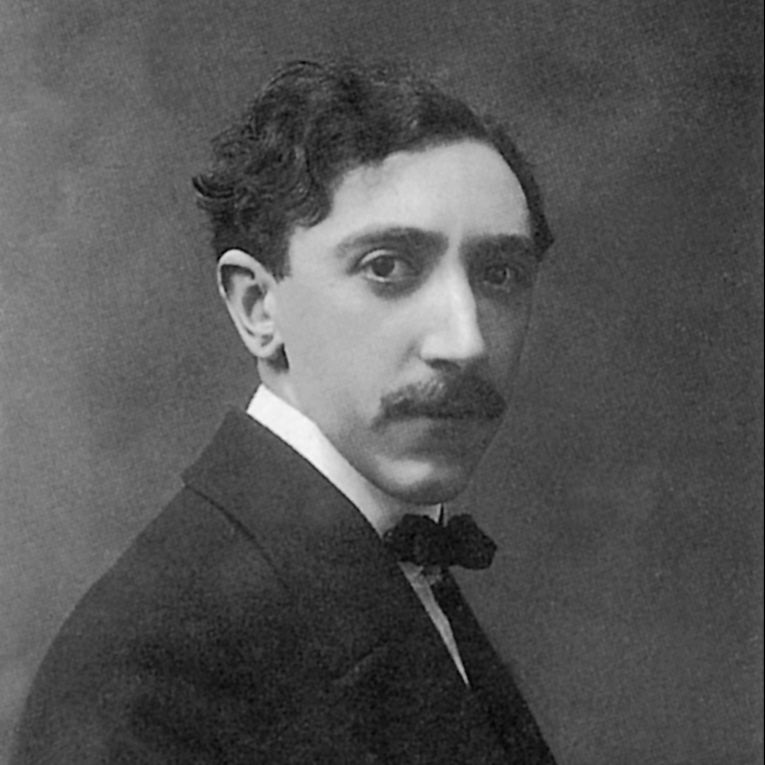
Jesús Guridi in 1915

Jesús Guridi Bidaola (25 September 1886 – 7 April 1961) was a Spanish Basque composer who was a key player in 20th-century Spanish and Basque music. His style fits into the late Romantic idiom, directly inherited from Wagner, and with a strong influence from Basque culture. Among his best-known works are the zarzuela El Caserío, the opera Amaya, the orchestral work Ten Basque Melodies and his organ works, where the Triptych of the Good Shepherd can be highlighted.

== Biography ==
Guridi was born in Vitoria-Gasteiz into a family of musicians. His mother, Maria Trinidad Bidaola, was a violinist and his father, Lorenzo Guridi, was a pianist (Menéndez and Pizà 2001). After completing his early studies with the Piarists and the Jesuits of Zaragoza he moved to Madrid, where he received lessons from Valentín Arín. Later, in Bilbao, he received violin lessons from Lope Alaña, who introduced him to the society called "El Cuartito", and studied harmony with José Sáinz Besabe (Menéndez and Pizà 2001). On 28 January 1901 he gave his first public concert with the Philharmonic Society of Bilbao. At the age of 18 he was enrolled in the Schola Cantorum in Paris, studying organ with Abel Decaux, composition with Auguste Sérieyx, and fugue and counterpoint with Vincent d'Indy. Here he met José María Usandizaga, with whom he developed a deep friendship.

He then moved to Brussels, where he studied with Joseph Jongen and in Cologne with Otto Neitzel, following the recommendations of Resurrección Maria de Azcue. In June 1912 he was appointed director of the Bilbao Choral Society. In the same year, his friend Usandizaga died.

In 1922 he married Julia Ispizua. The couple had six children: María Jesús, Luis Fernando, María Isabel, Ignacio, Julia, and Javier. In 1944 he began working at the Madrid Conservatory, where, years later, he became director.

He died suddenly on 7 April 1961 at the age of 74 years in his home on Sagasta Street in Madrid.

== Musical style ==
Strongly influenced by Richard Wagner and other late-Romantic musicians, he found inspiration in the roots of Basque folklore in his first scores, and which later give body and soul to his compositions. Guridi produced copiously in a huge range of genres. From chamber music (string quartets), vocal and choral compositions, orchestral works, liturgical and concert pieces for the organ, operas (Mirentxu and Amaya) and zarzuelas (El Caserio, La Meiga, etc.). Among his works are: El Caserio (1926), Diez melodias Vascas (1940), Así cantan los chicos (1909), Amaya (1920), Mirentxu (1910), Una aventura de Don Quixote (1916), La Meiga (1929), Seis canciones castellanas (1939), Pyrenean Symphony (1945), and Homenaje a Walt Disney, for piano and orchestra (1956).

== His work ==
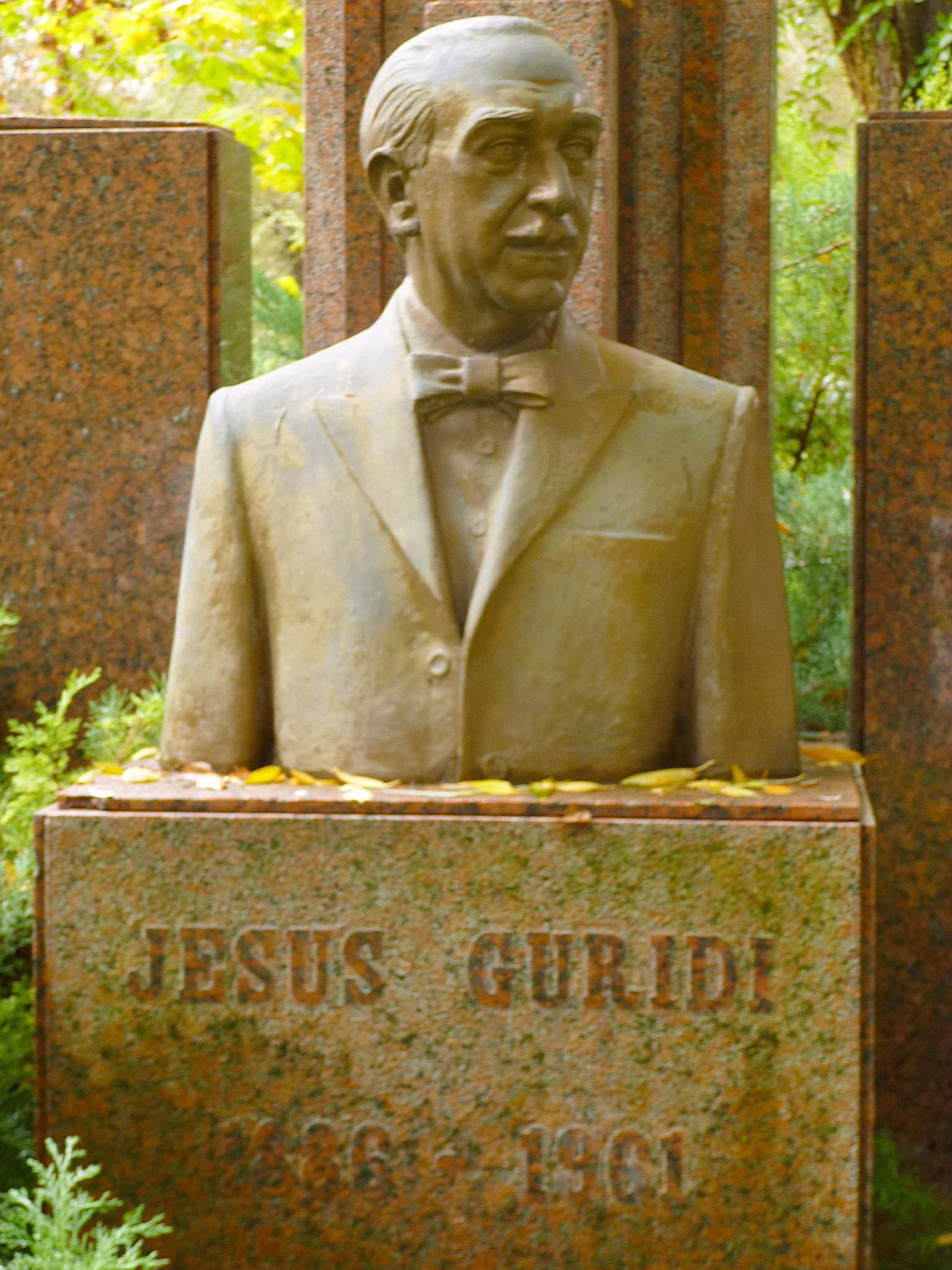
Monument to Jesús Guridi, Vitoria-Gasteiz.

Despite his intense activity as an organist, choir director and teacher, Guridi was largely devoted to composition. The variety of genres he cultivated is very wide, ranging from symphonic music to film music, operas and operettas, chamber music, choral music, songs and music for children.

Guridi's music writing is characterized by the clarity of its formal organization, by the strength and richness of its harmony and the inspiration of the melodies. He was one of the main creators of musical nationalism in Basque Country and Spain.

These are some of his most important works:

=== Opera ===
His best known opera is Amaya (libretto by Joseph M. Arroita Jáuregui), released at the Coliseo Albia in Bilbao in 1920, and also Mirentxu (libretto by Alfred Etxabe), released in Bilbao in 1910.

=== Zarzuela ===
Probably his best known zarzuela and work is El Caserío (The Farmhouse, libretto by Guillermo Fernández Shaw and Federico Romero), premiered in Madrid in 1926.

It is also worth mentioning La Meiga (by the same authors), La Cautiva (The Captive, by LF Seville and A. Carreño), released in 1931, Mandolinata (A. C. de la Vega, 1934) and Mari-Eli, Basque operetta (E. Carlos and Arniches Garay, 1936) as well as the lyrical La bengala (The flare, by L. Weaver and J. Hollow, 1939), Peñamariana (Romero and Fernandez Shaw, 1944), and Acuarelas vascas (Basque Watercolours, 1948).

=== Orchestra ===
On orchestral music, his most famous work is Ten Basque melodies (1940). He also composed Basque Legend in 1915, the symphonic poem An Adventure of Don Quixote (1916) and En un barco fenicio (In a Phoenician ship), in 1927. In 1945 he composed his Pyrenean Symphony and, in 1956, Tribute to Walt Disney Fantasy for piano and orchestra.

=== Choral music ===
Vocal music is also present in Guridi's work. Six Castilian Songs, composed in 1939, can be highlighted. Other Guridi's choral works are: So the children sing (1915), for chorus and orchestra, Euskal folkloreko XXII Abesti (Basque popular songs, 1932), Basque Songs (1956), Boga boga (Popular Basque, 1913), Anton Aizkorri (1913), Ator, ator mutil (Christmas Eve Song, 1920), Mass in honor of the Archangel Gabriel, for chorus and organ (1955), Mass in honor of San Ignacio de Loyola, (3 voices and organ, 1922), Requiem Mass for chorus and organ (1918), Te Deum, for chorus and organ (1937), Ave Maria (1907), Hail, for gold and organ (1916), Tantum ergo, for choir and organ (1915) and Basque Folk Songs, for chorus of mixed voices (1913–1923).

=== Piano and chamber music ===
They are also noteworthy creations of incidental music for film and his work for solo piano, which include Old Dances (1939), 8 Notes For Piano (1954), Ten Basque melodies, Lamento e imprecación de Agar (1958), Piano Pieces (1905), Three short pieces (1910) and Vasconia (1924). He also cultivated chamber music, and he wrote two string quartets, Quartet in G major (1934) and Quartet in A minor (1949; dedicated to the cellist Juan Ruiz Casaux).

=== Organ ===
The organ was probably Guridi's favourite instrument, in his role as a performer and as a teacher. He was a master of improvisation and he remained active as an organist until the end of his days.

Guridi was appointed professor of organ and harmony at the Institute of Music of Bizkaia in 1922, and in 1944 he won by opposition the organ national chair of the Royal Conservatory of Music in Madrid, which in 1956 would become director. He served for years as organist of the Church of San Manuel and San Benito, Madrid.

In 1909, when he was still very young, he won the Gold Medal in the Valencia Regional Exhibition, with his Fantasy for great organ, a piece composed between 1906 and 1907 and premiered by Guridi himself. Also in 1909 he composed an Interlude and in 1917 he wrote another Fantasy, that was published under the title Prelude and Fantasy.

In 1922 he composed Cuadros vascos (Basque scenes), for chorus and orchestra, and adapted, for solo organ, the Espatadantza (traditional Basque dance) contained in this work. He also adapted for organ Four Cantigas of Alfonso el Sabio in 1953.

In 1948 he composed Variations on a Basque theme, which consists of nine variations on the popular song Itsasoa laino dago (There is fog on the sea), contained in Resurrección Mª de Azkue's Songbook.

In 1951, Guridi grouped twenty short and not difficult of execution pieces for organ teaching approach under the title Spanish School of Organ (1. Introducción – 2. Capriccio – 3. Cantinela – 4. Himno – 5. Improvisación – 6. Canción vasca – 7. Salida – 8. Interludio – 9. Plegaria – 10. Preludio – 11. Pastorela – 12. Villancico – 13. Glosa (Puer natus est) – 14. Éxtasis – 15. Fuga – 16. Adagio – 17. Ave Maria – 18. Ofertorio I – 19. Ofertorio II – 20. Tocata).

In 1953 he wrote the beautiful Triptych of the Good Shepherd ("The Flock", "The Lost Sheep" and "The Good Shepherd"), surely his masterpiece in this field, which won the first prize in the composition competition organized by Organería Española because of the inauguration of the new organ of the Good Shepherd Cathedral in San Sebastián. Guridi himself premiered his "Triptych" on 20 January 1954 in this temple. The other composers awarded in the competition were Tomás Garbizu, Luis Urteaga and José María Nemesio Otaño. In 2007, the concert offered by these composers, 19 and 20 January 1954, was reproduced, and the concert ended with the work of Guridi.

Shortly before his death in 1961, he composed a Final for organ, a composition of great character in the line of the French master Louis Vierne.

== See also ==
- Conservatory Jesús Guridi
