= 1946 in music =

This is a list of notable events in music that took place in the year 1946.

== Specific locations ==
- 1946 in British music
- 1946 in Norwegian music

== Specific genres ==
- 1946 in country music
- 1946 in jazz

== Events ==
- January 6 – A somewhat revised and streamlined revival of Jerome Kern and Oscar Hammerstein II's Show Boat opens on Broadway at the Ziegfeld Theatre, the same theatre at which the original production played in 1927. This production features newly designed sets and costumes, new, more extended choreography, and a new song, Nobody Else But Me, by Kern and Hammerstein.
- February – Kathleen Ferrier's recording contract with Columbia Records expires, and she transfers to Decca.
- May 24 – John Serry Sr. collaborates with the vocalist Sidor Belarsky and the Mischa Borr Orchestra in recordings of Ukrainian folk songs and "Dark Night".
- August 22 - John Serry Sr performs as the "outstanding accordionist of the year" with the conductor Archie Bleyer on Gordon Macrae's Skyline Roof broadcast with the CBS network.
- August – American singer Doris Day leaves Les Brown's band and begins her solo career.
- September 11 – The Royal Philharmonic Orchestra holds its first rehearsal.
- Formation of Bamberg Symphony; Southwest German Radio Symphony Orchestra; and RIAS Symphonie-Orchester.
- Al Jolson rerecords his old hits for the soundtrack of his Columbia biopic The Jolson Story (released October 10 in the United States), and becomes a superstar to the post-war generation too.
- B. B. King begins working as a professional musician in Memphis, Tennessee.
- Chet Atkins makes his first appearance at the Grand Ole Opry.
- Georgia Gibbs signs with the Majestic label.
- Bill Haley's professional musical career begins as a member of The Down Homers. His earliest known recordings are made during a Down Homers radio performance, but will not be released until 2006.
- John Serry Sr. appears as the guest accordion soloist on the Danny O'Neil Show on the CBS network.

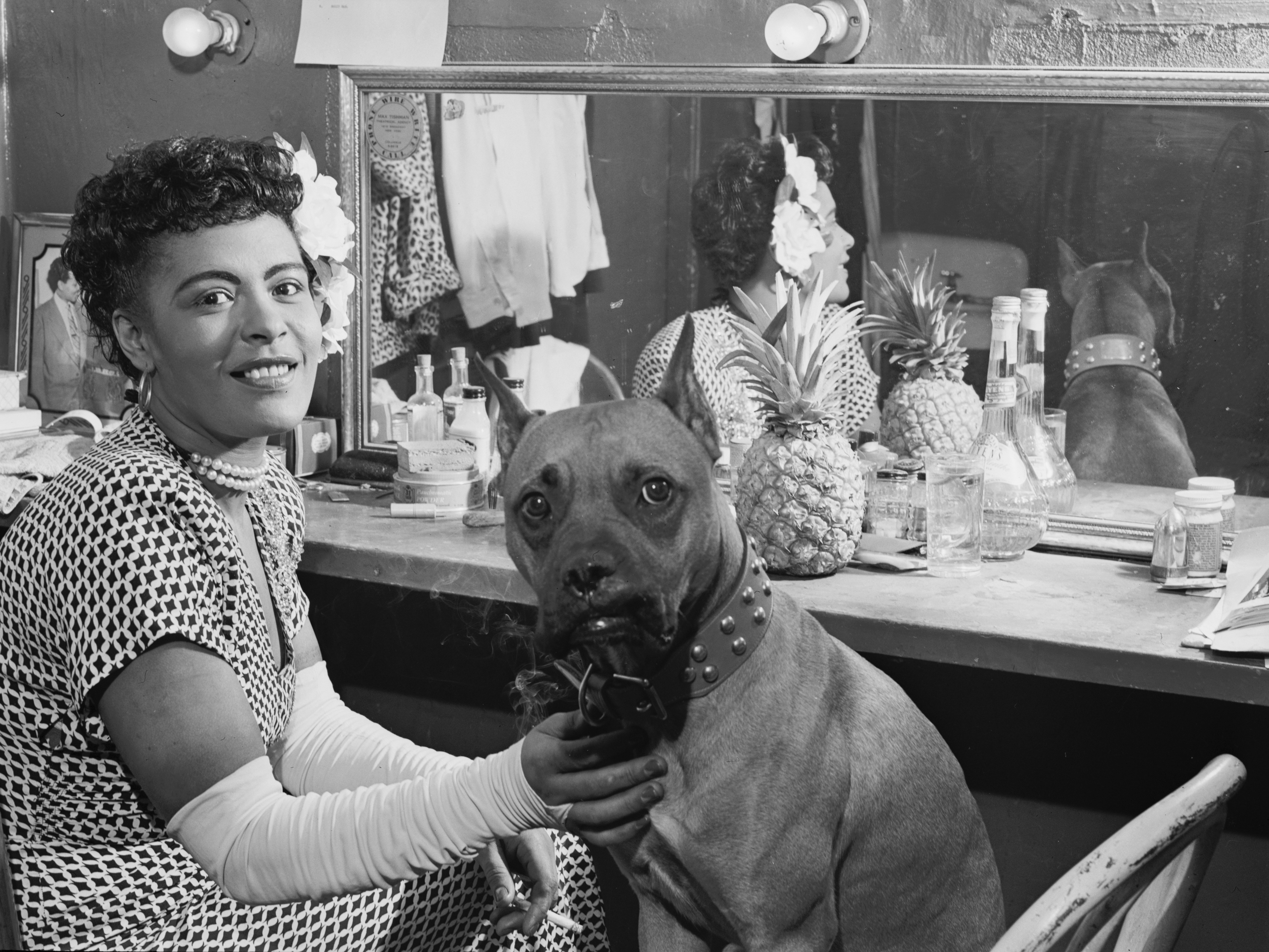
Singer Billie Holiday backstage in 1946

== Albums released ==
- Accordion Capers – Joe Biviano Accordion Rhythm Sextette with Tony Mottola and John Serry.
- Annie Get Your Gun – Original Broadway cast
- Show Boat – Original Broadway cast
- Frank Sinatra Conducts the Music of Alec Wilder – Frank Sinatra
- Lombardoland – Guy Lombardo
- Louis Jordan And His Tympany Five – Louis Jordan
- Manhattan Tower – Gordon Jenkins
- The Voice of Frank Sinatra – Frank Sinatra
- Merry Christmas Music – Perry Como
- What We So Proudly Hail – Bing Crosby
- Favorite Hawaiian Songs, Vol. One – Bing Crosby
- Favorite Hawaiian Songs, Vol. Two – Bing Crosby
- Blue Skies – Bing Crosby
- Don't Fence Me In – Bing Crosby and The Andrews Sisters

== Top popular records of 1946 ==
For each Year in Music (beginning 1940) and Year in Country Music (beginning 1939), a comprehensive Year End Top Records section can be found at mid-page (popular), and on the Country page.

The charts are compiled from data published by Billboard magazine, using their formulas, with slight modifications. Most important, there are no songs missing or truncated by Billboard's holiday deadline. Each year, records included enter the charts between the prior November and early December. Each week, fifteen points are awarded to the number one record, then nine points for number two, eight points for number three, and so on. This system rewards songs that reach the highest positions, as well as those that had the longest chart runs. This is our adjustment to Mr. Whitburn's formula, which places no. 1 records on top, then no 2 and so on, ordered by weeks at that position. This allows a record with 4 weeks at no. 1 that only lasted 6 weeks to be rated very high. Here, the total points of a song's complete chart run determines its position. Our chart has more songs, more weeks and may look nothing like Billboard's, but it comes from the exact same surveys.

Before the Hot 100 was implemented in 1958, Billboard magazine measured a record's performance with three charts, 'Best-Selling Popular Retail Records', 'Records Most-Played On the Air' or 'Records Most Played By Disk Jockeys' and 'Most-Played Juke Box Records'. As Billboard did starting in the 1940s, the three totals for each song are combined, with that number determining the final year-end rank. For example, 1944's "A Hot Time in the Town of Berlin" by Bing and the Andrews Sisters finished at no. 19, despite six weeks at no. 1 on the 'Most-Played Juke Box Records'(JB) chart. It scored 126 points, to go with its Best-Selling chart (BS) total of 0. Martha Tilton's version of "I'll Walk Alone" peaked at no. 4 on the Juke Box chart, which only totalled 65 points, but her BS total was also 65, for a final total of 130, ranking no. 18. Examples like this can be found in "The Billboard" magazine up to 1958. The 'Records Most-Played On the Air' chart didn't begin until January 1945, which is why we only had two sub-totals.

Our rankings are based on Billboard data, but we also present info on recording and release dates, global sales totals, RIAA and BPI certifications and other awards. Rankings from other genres like 'Hot R&B/Hip-Hop Songs' or 'Most Played Juke Box Race Records', Country charts including 'Most Played Juke Box Folk (Hillbilly) Records', 'Cashbox magazine', and other sources are presented if they exist. We supplement our info with reliable data from the "Discography of American Historical Recordings" website, Joel Whitburn's Pop Memories 1890-1954 and other sources as specified.

The following songs appeared in The Billboard's 'Best Selling Retail Records', 'Records Most-Played On the Air' and 'Most Played Juke Box Records' charts, starting November 1945 and before December 1946.

Rank	Artist	Title	Label	Recorded	Released	Chart positions
1	Eddy Howard and His Orchestra	"To Each His Own"	Majestic 7188	April 16, 1946	June 1946	US Billboard 1946 #1, US #1 for 8 weeks, 24 total weeks, 576 points, CashBox #3, 1,000,000 sales
2	The Ink Spots	"The Gypsy"	Decca 18817	February 19, 1946	March 1946	US Billboard 1946 #2, US #1 for 13 weeks, 23 total weeks, CashBox #1, US Most-Played Race Records 1945 #3, Race Records #1 for 3 weeks, 13 total weeks, 548 points, 1,000,000 sales
3	Frankie Carle and his Orchestra (vocal by Marjorie Hughes)	"Rumors Are Flying"	Columbia 37069	June 20, 1946	August 19, 1946	US Billboard 1946 #3, US #1 for 11 weeks, 28 total weeks, 477 points, CashBox #6, 1,000,000 sales
4	Frank Sinatra	"Five Minutes More"	Columbia 37048	May 28, 1946	July 8, 1946	US Billboard 1946 #4, US #1 for 7 weeks, 19 total weeks, 453 points
5	Swing and Sway With Sammy Kaye	"The Old Lamp-Lighter"	RCA Victor 20-1963	August 21, 1946	September 1946	US Billboard 1946 #5, US #1 for 8 weeks (Juke Box), 21 total weeks, 452 points, CashBox #8
6	Frankie Carle and his Orchestra (vocal by Marjorie Hughes	"Oh! What It Seemed to Be"	Columbia 36892	October 15, 1945	December 17, 1945	US Billboard 1946 #6, US #1 for 11 weeks (Juke Box), 20 total weeks, 436 points, CashBox #5
7	Perry Como	"Prisoner of Love"	RCA Victor 20-1814	December 18, 1945	March 1946	US Billboard 1946 #7, US #1 for 3 weeks, 20 total weeks, 429 points, 1,000,000 sales
8	Dinah Shore	"The Gypsy"	Columbia 36964	February 12, 1946	March 25, 1946	US Billboard 1946 #8, US #1 for 8 weeks, 17 total weeks, 358 points, CashBox #2, Grammy Hall of Fame in 1998, 1,000,000 sales
9	Vaughn Monroe and his Orchestra	"Let It Snow! Let It Snow! Let It Snow!"	Victor 20-1759	October 31, 1945	November 1945	US Billboard 1946 #9, US #1 for 6 weeks, 16 total weeks, 349 points
10	King Cole Trio	"(I Love You) For Sentimental Reasons"	Capitol 304	August 22, 1946	September 30, 1946	US Billboard 1946 #10, US #1 for 7 weeks, 16 total weeks, CashBox #1, US Most-Played Race Records 1945 #20, Race Records #3 for 2 weeks, 8 total weeks, 293 points, Grammy Hall of Fame 2018, 1,000,000 sales
11	Betty Hutton	"Doctor, Lawyer, Indian Chief"	Capitol 220	June 29, 1945	November 1945	US Billboard 1946 #10, US #1 for 1 week, 22 total weeks, 299 points
12	Frank Sinatra	"Oh! What It Seemed to Be"	Columbia 36905	November 19, 1945	January 14, 1946	US Billboard 1946 #11, US #1 for 8 weeks, 28 total weeks, 295 points, CashBox #7
13	Freddy Martin and His Orchestra	"Symphony"	Victor 20-1747	October 2, 1945	November 1945	US BB 1945 #12, US #1 for 2 weeks, 13 total weeks
14	Johnny Mercer and The Pied Pipers	"Personality"	Capitol 230	October 1, 1945	December 1945	US Billboard 1946 #13, US #1 for 1 weeks, 17 total weeks, 289 points, Grammy Hall of Fame in 1998
15	Freddy Martin and His Orchestra	"To Each His Own"	RCA Victor 20-1921	1946	July 1946	US Billboard 1946 #14, US #1 for 2 weeks, 16 total weeks, 255 points, CashBox #4
16	Kay Kyser and His Orchestra	"Ole Buttermilk Sky"	Columbia 37073	June 15, 1946	August 26, 1946	US Billboard 1946 #15, US #1 for 7 weeks, 16 total weeks, 253 points
17	Perry Como	"Surrender"	RCA Victor 20-1877	April 2, 1946	June 1946	US Billboard 1946 #16, US #1 for 9 weeks, 17 total weeks, 250 points
18	Bing Crosby and The Andrews Sisters	"South America, Take It Away"	Decca 23569	May 11, 1946	June 1946	US Billboard 1946 #18, US #2 for 13 weeks, 17 total weeks, 213 points, 1,000,000 sales
19	Hoagy Carmichael and Orchestra	"Ole Buttermilk Sky"	ARA 155	April 2, 1946	June 1946	US Billboard 1946 #19, US #1 for 1 weeks, 17 total weeks, 182 points, Grammy Hall of Fame in 1998
20	Dinah Shore	"Doin' What Comes Natur'lly"	Columbia 36976	March 16, 1946	April 29, 1946	US Billboard 1946 #20, US #3 for 1 weeks, 17 total weeks, 159 points, CashBox #3
21	Dinah Shore	"Laughing on the Outside (Crying on the Inside)"	Columbia 36964	February 12, 1946	March 25, 1946	US Billboard 1946 #21, US #3 for 1 weeks, 17 total weeks, 158 points, CashBox #3
22	Kay Kyser and His Orchestra	"The Old Lamp-Lighter"	Columbia 37095	July 18, 1946	October 14, 1946	US Billboard 1946 #22, US #1 for 7 weeks, 16 total weeks, 143 points, CashBox #9
23	Swing and Sway With Sammy Kaye	"I'm A Big Girl Now"	RCA Victor 20-1812	December 22, 1945	February 1946	US Billboard 1946 #23, US #1 for 1 week, 18 total weeks, 141 points, CashBox #6, 1,000,000 sales

== Top race records ==
Billboard Most-Played Race Records of 1946 is a year-end list compiled by Billboard magazine, printed in the January 4, 1947, issue. It includes rankings for the calendar year only, handicapping records at the beginning and end of the year such as "Choo Choo Ch'Boogie", which finished second as a result. For all year-end charts on these pages, records that enter the chart in December of the previous year, or remain on the chart after December of the current year, receive points for their full chart runs. Each week, a score of 15 points is assigned for the no. 1 record, 9 points for no. 2, 8 points for no. 3, and so on, and the total of all weeks determined the final rank. Additional information from other sources is reported, but not used for ranking. This includes dates obtained from the Discography of American Historical Recordings website, chart performance from Billboard's 'Best Selling Retail Records, Records Most-Played On the Air and Most Played Juke Box Records charts, Most Played Juke Box Folk (Hillbilly) Records, Cashbox, and other sources as noted. Additional information can also be found at List of Most Played Juke Box Race Records number ones of 1946.

Rank	Artist	Title	Label	Recorded	Released	Chart positions
1	Louis Jordan and His Tympany Five	"Choo Choo Ch'Boogie"	Decca 23610	January 23, 1946	August 1946	US Billboard 1946 #54, US #7 for 1 weeks, 6 total weeks, US Most-Played Race Records 1946 #1, Race Records #1 for 18 weeks, 26 total weeks, 1,000,000 sales
2	Lionel Hampton and His Orchestra	"Hey! Ba-Ba-Re-Bop"	Decca 18754	December 1, 1945	January 1946	US Billboard 1946 #114, US #9 for 1 weeks, 8 total weeks, US Most-Played Race Records 1946 #2, Race Records #1 for 16 weeks, 25 total weeks
3	Louis Jordan and His Tympany Five	"Buzz Me"	Decca 18734	January 19, 1945	December 1945	US BB 1946 #90, US #9 for 1 week, 2 total weeks, US Most-Played Race Records 1946 #3, Race Records #1 for 9 weeks, 13 total weeks
4	Ella Fitzgerald and Louis Jordan and His Tympany Five	"Stone Cold Dead in the Market (He Had It Coming)"	Decca 23546	October 8, 1945	January 29, 1946	US Billboard 1946 #76, US #7 for 1 weeks, 6 total weeks, US Most-Played Race Records 1946 #4, Race Records #1 for 5 weeks, 20 total weeks, 95 points
5	Louis Jordan and His Tympany Five	"Ain't That Just Like a Woman (They'll Do It Every Time)"	Decca 23669	January 23, 1946	October 1946	US Billboard 1946 #229, US #17 for 1 week, 2 total weeks, US Most-Played Race Records 1946 #6, Race Records #1 for 2 weeks, 17 total weeks, 74 points
6	The Ink Spots	"The Gypsy"	Decca 18817	February 19, 1946	March 1946	US Billboard 1946 #2, US #1 for 13 weeks, 23 total weeks, 55 points, CashBox #1, US Most-Played Race Records 1946 #5, Race Records #1 for 2 weeks, 13 total weeks, 1,000,000 sales
7	Roy Milton and His Solid Senders	"R. M. Blues"	Juke Box 504	July 1946	March 1946	US Most-Played Race Records 1946 #7, Race Records #2 for 2 weeks, 25 total weeks, 54 points
8	Johnny Moore's Three Blazers (vocal Charles Brown)	"Driftin' Blues"	Philo 112	September 14, 1945	December 1945	US Billboard Most-Played Juke Box Race Records 1946 #8, US #2 for 1 week, 23 total weeks, 48 points
9	Louis Jordan and His Tympany Five	"Salt Pork, West Virginia"	Decca 18762	July 16, 1945	February 1946	US Most-Played Race Records 1946 #9, Harlem/Race Records #2 for 6 weeks, 15 total weeks, 44 points
10	Louis Jordan and His Tympany Five	"Don't Worry 'Bout That Mule"	Decca 18734	January 10, 1946	March 1946	US Most-Played Race Records 1946 #10, Race Records #1 for 1 week, 11 total weeks, 43 points
11	Andy Kirk and His Orchestra and The Jubalaires	"I Know"	Decca 18782	November 27, 1945	April 1946	US Billboard 1946 #277, US #21 for 1 week, 1 total weeks, US Most-Played Race Records 1946 #11, Race Records #2 for 4 weeks, 16 total weeks, 34 points
12	King Cole Trio	"(Get Your Kicks On) Route 66"	Capitol 256	March 15, 1946	April 22, 1946	US Billboard 1946 #137, US #11 for 1 weeks, 2 total weeks, US Most-Played Race Records 1946 #12, Race Records #1 for 1 week, 11 total weeks, 30 points, Grammy Hall of Fame 2018, 1,000,000 sales
13	Louis Jordan and His Tympany Five	"That Chick's Too Young To Fry"	Decca 23610	January 23, 1946	August 1946	US Most-Played Race Records 1946 #13, Race Records #3 for 8 weeks, 11 total weeks, 30 points
20	King Cole Trio	"(I Love You) For Sentimental Reasons"	Capitol 304	August 22, 1946	September 30, 1946	US Billboard 1946 #10, US #1 for 7 weeks, 16 total weeks, CashBox #1, US Most-Played Race Records 1945 #20, Race Records #3 for 2 weeks, 8 total weeks, 17 points, Grammy Hall of Fame 2018, 1,000,000 sales

== Published popular music ==
- "Ain't Nobody Here but Us Chickens" words and music: Alex Kramer & Joan Whitney
- "Ain't That Just Like A Woman?" w.m. Fleecie Moore & Claude Demetrius
- "All I Want For Christmas (Is My Two Front Teeth)" w.m. Don Gardner
- "All The Cats Join In" A. Wilder, Ray Gilbert, E. Sauter
- "Along With Me" w.m. Harold Rome Introduced by Danny Scholl and Paula Bane in the musical Call Me Mister
- "The 'Ampstead Way" w. Johnny Burke m. Jimmy Van Heusen
- "The Anniversary Song" w.m. Al Jolson & Saul Chaplin
- "Any Place I Hang My Hat Is Home" w. Johnny Mercer m. Harold Arlen
- "Anything You Can Do" w.m. Irving Berlin
- "Aren't You Kind Of Glad We Did?" w. Ira Gershwin m. George Gershwin. Introduced by Dick Haymes and Betty Grable in the 1947 film The Shocking Miss Pilgrim
- "Blue Moon of Kentucky" w.m. Bill Monroe
- "Bumble Boogie" m. Jack Fina
- "Changing My Tune" w. Ira Gershwin m. George Gershwin. Introduced by Betty Grable in the film The Shocking Miss Pilgrim.
- "The Christmas Song" w. Robert Wells m. Mel Tormé
- "Coax Me A Little Bit" w. Charles Tobias m. Nat Simon
- "The Coffee Song" w.m. Bob Hilliard & Dick Miles
- "Come Rain Or Come Shine" w. Johnny Mercer m. Harold Arlen
- "Country Style" w. Johnny Burke m. Jimmy Van Heusen
- "A Couple of Song and Dance Men" w.m. Irving Berlin
- "Do You Know What It Means To Miss New Orleans?" w.m. Eddie DeLange & Louis Alter. Introduced by Billie Holiday & Louis Armstrong in the 1947 film New Orleans.
- "Doin' What Comes Natur'lly" w.m. Irving Berlin
- "The Face on the Dime" w.m. Harold Rome. Introduced by Lawrence Winters in the musical revue Call Me Mister.
- "Feudin' And Fightin' " w. Al Dubin & Burton Lane m. Burton Lane
- "Five Minutes More" w. Sammy Cahn m. Jule Styne
- "For You, For Me, For Evermore" w. Ira Gershwin m. George Gershwin. Introduced by Dick Haymes in the 1947 film The Shocking Miss Pilgrim
- "A Gal In Calico" w. Leo Robin m. Arthur Schwartz. Introduced by Jack Carson, Sally Sweetland dubbing for Martha Vickers, and Dennis Morgan in the film The Time, the Place and the Girl.
- "The Girl That I Marry" w.m. Irving Berlin. Introduced by Ray Middleton in the musical Annie Get Your Gun and performed by Howard Keel in the 1950 film version.
- "Golden Earrings" w. Jay Livingston & Ray Evans m. Victor Young
- "The House Of Blue Lights" w.m. Don Raye & Freddie Slack
- "How Are Things in Glocca Morra?" w. E. Y. Harburg m. Burton Lane
- "I Got Lost in His Arms" w.m. Irving Berlin. Introduced by Ethel Merman in the musical Annie Get Your Gun.
- "I Got The Sun In The Morning" w.m. Irving Berlin. Introduced by Ethel Merman in the musical Annie Get Your Gun and performed by Betty Hutton in the 1950 film version.
- "If This Isn't Love" w. E. Y. Harburg m. Burton Lane
- "If You Smile at Me" w.m. Cole Porter. Introduced by Victoria Cordova in the musical Around the World
- "I'm An Indian Too" w.m. Irving Berlin
- "It's A Good Day" w.m. Peggy Lee & Dave Barbour
- "It's A Pity To Say Goodnight" w.m. Billy Reid
- "Laughing On The Outside" w. Ben Raleigh m. Bernie Wayne
- "Legalise My Name" w. Johnny Mercer m. Harold Arlen
- "Let The Good Times Roll" w.m. Fleecie Moore & Sam Theard
- "Linda" w.m. Jack Lawrence
- "Lost In The Stars" w. Maxwell Anderson m. Kurt Weill
- "Managua, Nicaragua" w. Albert Gamse m. Irving Fields
- "Military Life" aka "The Jerk Song" w.m. Harold Rome from the musical revue Call Me Mister
- "Moonshine Lullaby" w.m. Irving Berlin
- "Mr. Jackson from Jacksonville" m.w. Louis Armstrong, Claude Demetrius, Fritz Pollard
- "My Defenses Are Down" w.m. Irving Berlin
- "My Heart Is A Hobo" w. Johnny Burke m. Jimmy Van Heusen
- "Old Devil Moon" w. E. Y. Harburg m. Burton Lane
- "The Old Lamp-Lighter" w. Charles Tobias m. Nat Simon
- "The Old Soft Shoe" w. Nancy Hamilton m. Morgan Lewis. Introduced by Ray Bolger in the revue Three to Make Ready.
- "Ole Buttermilk Sky" w.m. Hoagy Carmichael
- "One-zy Two-zy" w.m. Dave Franklin & Irving Taylor
- "Open The Door, Richard" w. "Dusty" Fletcher & John Mason m. Jack McVea & Dan Howell
- "Put The Blame On Mame" w.m. Allan Roberts & Doris Fisher. Introduced by Anita Ellis dubbing for Rita Hayworth in the film Gilda.
- "A Rainy Night In Rio" w. Leo Robin m. Arthur Schwartz. Introduced by Dennis Morgan, Jack Carson, Janis Paige and Sally Sweetland dubbing for Martha Vickers in the film The Time, the Place and the Girl
- "The Red Ball Express" w.m. Harold Rome. Introduced by Lawrence Winters in the musical revue Call Me Mister.
- "(Get Your Kicks On) Route 66" w.m. Bobby Troup
- "Rumors Are Flying" w.m. Bennie Benjamin & George David Weiss
- "Sooner Or Later" w. Ray Gilbert m. Charles Wolcott
- "South America, Take It Away" w.m. Harold Rome Introduced by Betty Garrett in the musical revue Call Me Mister.
- "Stella by Starlight" w. Ned Washington m. Victor Young
- "Stone Cold Dead in de Market" w.m. Wilmoth Houdini
- "A Sunday Kind of Love" w.m. Barbara Belle, Anita Leonard, Stan Rhodes & Louis Prima
- "Tenderly" w. Jack Lawrence m. Walter Gross
- "That's All Right" w.m. Arthur Crudup
- "There's Good Blues Tonight" Edna Osser, Glenn Osser
- "There's No Business Like Show Business" w.m. Irving Berlin
- "They Say It's Wonderful" w.m. Irving Berlin
- "The Things We Did Last Summer" w. Sammy Cahn m. Jule Styne
- "Time After Time" w. Sammy Cahn m. Jule Styne
- "To Each His Own" w. Ray Evans m. Jay Livingston
- "Valse" m. Tchaikovsky arr. John Serry, Sr.
- "La vie en rose" w. (Eng) Mack David (Fr) Édith Piaf m. Louiguy
- "When I Walk with You" w. John Latouche m. Duke Ellington. Introduced by Alfred Drake and Jet MacDonald in the musical Beggar's Holiday
- "Who Do You Love, I Hope" w.m. Irving Berlin
- "A Woman's Prerogative" w. Johnny Mercer m. Harold Arlen
- "You Call Everybody Darling" w.m. Sam Martin, Ben Trace & Clem Watts
- "You Can't Get A Man With A Gun" w.m. Irving Berlin
- "You Make Me Feel So Young" w. Mack Gordon m. Josef Myrow
- "Zip-A-Dee-Doo-Dah" w. Ray Gilbert m. Allie Wrubel

== Classical music ==
=== Premieres ===
Composer	Composition	Date	Location	Performers
Barber, Samuel	Cello Concerto	1946-04-05	Boston	Garbousova / Boston Symphony – Koussevitzky
Bartók, Béla	Piano Concerto No. 3	1946-02-08	Philadelphia	Sándor / Philadelphia Orchestra – Ormandy
Bernstein, Leonard	Three Dance Episodes from "On the Town"	1946-02-03	San Francisco	San Francisco Symphony – Bernstein
Bernstein, Leonard	Three Dance Variations from Fancy Free	1946-01-21	New York City	New York City Symphony – Bernstein
Boulez, Pierre	Douze notations for piano	1946-02-12	Paris	Grimaud
Britten, Benjamin	Occasional Overture	1946-09-29	London	BBC Symphony – Boult
Britten, Benjamin	The Holy Sonnets of John Donne	1946-11-22	London	Pears, Britten
Britten, Benjamin	The Young Person's Guide to the Orchestra	1946-10-15	Liverpool	Royal Liverpool Philharmonic – Sargent
Cage, John	Three Dances for Two Prepared Pianos	1946-12-11	New York City	Ajemian, Masselos
Carter, Elliott	Elegy for String Quartet	1946-08-21	Eliot, Maine	Lanier Quartet
Carter, Elliott	Musicians Wrestle Everywhere	1946-02-12	New York City	Randolph Singers – Randolph
Carter, Elliott	Voyage for voice and piano	1946-03-16	New York City	Boatwright, Baerwald
Carter, Elliott	Warble for Lilac Time	1946-09-14	Saratoga Springs, New York (Spa Festival)	Boatwright / Yaddo Orchestra – Fennell
Copland, Aaron	Danzón cubano	1946-02-17	Baltimore	Baltimore Symphony – Stewart
Copland, Aaron	Symphony No. 3	1946-10-18	Boston	Boston Symphony – Koussevitzky
Dallapiccola, Luigi	Ciaccona, Intermezzo e Adagio for cello	1946-02-26	Milan	Cassadó
Dallapiccola, Luigi	Liriche Greche II – Due liriche di Anacreonte	1946-06-24	Brussels	Martin-Metten / Brussels Philharmonic – Souris
Dallapiccola, Luigi	Rencesvals	1946-12-19	Brussels	Bernac, Poulenc
Dallapiccola, Luigi	Sonatina canonica su Capricci di Paganini	1946-03-03	Perugia, Italy	Scarpini
Ginastera, Alberto	Sinfonía elegíaca (Symphony No. 2)	1946-05-31	Buenos Aires	[unknown orchestra] – Castro
Guridi, Jesús	Sinfonía Pirenaica	1946-06-08	Bilbao	Bilbao Municipal Orchestra – Arámbarri
Henze, Hans Werner	Chamber Concerto for piano, flute and strings	1946-09-27	Darmstädter Ferienkurse, Germany	Redel, Seemann / Darmstadt Landestheater Orchestra – Straub
Ives, Charles	Central Park in the Dark (1906)	1946-05-11	New York City	Students of the Juilliard School – Bloomfield
Ives, Charles	In Summer Fields (1898)	1946-11-12	Los Angeles	Dice, Wenger
Ives, Charles	String Quartet No. 2 (1913)	1946-05-11	New York City	Students of the Juilliard School
Ives, Charles	The Camp Meeting (Symphony No. 3) (1904)	1946-04-05	New York City	New York Little Symphony – Harrison
Ives, Charles	The Unanswered Question (1906)	1946-05-11	New York City	Students of the Juilliard School – Bloomfield
Jolivet, André	Divertissement à la roumaine	1946-12-19	Paris	[unknown performers]
Jongen, Joseph	Mass, Op. 130	1946-06-23	Liège Cathedral, Belgium	Jongen
Korngold, Erich Wolfgang	Cello Concerto	1946-12-29	Los Angeles	Aller / Los Angeles Philharmonic – Svedrofsky
Krenek, Ernst	Symphony No. 3	1946-11-22	Minneapolis	Minneapolis Symphony – Mitropoulos
Krenek, Ernst	Symphonic Elegy in memoriam Anton Webern	1946-09-03	Saratoga Springs, New York (Spa Festival)	New York Philharmonic – Adler
Krenek, Ernst	Tricks and Trifles	1946-03-22	Minneapolis	Minneapolis Symphony – Mitropoulos
Martin, Frank	Petite symphonie concertante	1946-05-17	Zürich	Collegium Musicum Zurich – Sacher
Martinů, Bohuslav	Etudes and Polkas for Piano	1946-01-18	Cambridge, Massachusetts	Firkusny
Messiaen, Olivier	Harawi, chant d'amour et de mort	1946-06-27	Brussels	Bunlet, Messiaen
Milhaud, Darius	Symphony No. 2	1946-12-20	Boston	Boston Symphony – Piston
Prokofiev, Sergei	Violin Sonata No. 1	1946-10-23	Moscow	Oistrakh, Oborin
Schoenberg, Arnold	Theme and Variations for Band	1946-06-27	Boston	Boston Symphony – Koussevitzky
Shostakovich, Dmitri	String Quartet No. 3	1946-12-16	Moscow	Beethoven Quartet
Shostakovich, Dmitri	Victorious Spring	1946-05-08	Moscow	NKVD Choreographic and Vocal Ensemble – Silantsev
Strauss, Richard	Metamorphosen, study for 23 strings	1946-01-25	Zürich	Collegium Musicum Zürich – Sacher
Strauss, Richard	Oboe Concerto	1946-02-26	Zürich	Tonhalle Orchestra – Andreae
Stravinsky, Igor	Ebony Concerto for clarinet and jazz band	1946-03-25	New York City	Herman / Herman's Band – Hendel
Stravinsky, Igor	Scherzo à la russe	1946-03-22	San Francisco	San Francisco Symphony – Stravinsky
Stravinsky, Igor	Symphony in Three Movements	1946-01-24	New York City	New York Philharmonic – Stravinsky
Tippett, Michael	Little Music for Strings	1946-11-09	London	Jacques String Orchestra – Jacques
Tippett, Michael	String Quartet No. 3	1946-10-19	London	Zorian Quartet
Villa-Lobos, Heitor	Piano Concerto No. 1	1946-10-11	Theatro Municipal (Rio de Janeiro)	Ballon / Orquestra Sinfônica do Theatro Municipal – Villa-Lobos
Webern, Anton	Cantata No. 1	1946-07-12	London	Hooke / BBC Symphony Orchestra and Chorus – Rankl
Zimmermann, Bernd Alois	Capriccio for Piano, improvisations on folk themes	1946-07-12	Horrem, Germanu	Wirtz
Zimmermann, Bernd Alois	Drei Geistliche Lieder, improvisations on folk themes	1946-06-18	Cologne	Klaembt, Hecker
Zimmermann, Bernd Alois	Extemporale, five pieces for piano	1946-04-12	Cologne	Wirtz
Zimmermann, Bernd Alois	Scherzo sinfonico	1946-05-06	Cologne	Gürzenich Orchestra – Wand

=== Compositions ===
- Malcolm Arnold – Symphony for Strings, Op. 13
- Arno Babajanian – Polyphonic Piano Sonata
- Benjamin Britten – Young Person's Guide to the Orchestra
- Aaron Copland – Symphony No. 3
- George Crumb – Poem; Seven Songs for voice and piano
- Gottfried von Einem – Dantons Tod
- Don Gillis – Symphony No. 5½, A Symphony for Fun
- Ruth Gipps – Symphony No. 2
- Jesús Guridi – Sinfonía Pirenaica
- Karl Amadeus Hartmann – Symphony No. 2 "Adagio"
- Herbert Howells – Gloucester Service
- Wojciech Kilar – Mazurka in E minor
- Erich Wolfgang Korngold – Cello Concerto
- Bohuslav Martinů – Symphony No. 5, H.310; Toccata e Due Canzoni; String Quartet No. 6, H.312
- Peter Mennin – Symphony No. 3
- Vincent Persichetti – Symphony No. 3
- Edmund Rubbra – Cello Sonata, Op. 60
- John Serry Sr. –
  - Fantasy in F for accordion.
  - Valse – music by Tchaikovsky arranged for accordion by Serry
- Roger Sessions – Symphony No. 2, Piano Sonata No. 2
- Igor Stravinsky – Concerto in D for Strings
- Michael Tippett – Little Music for string orchestra
- Heitor Villa-Lobos – String Quartet No. 10
- William Walton – String Quartet in A minor

== Opera ==
- Benjamin Britten – The Rape of Lucretia – chamber opera opened at Glyndebourne on July 12 with Kathleen Ferrier in the title rôle
- Gian Carlo Menotti – The Medium

== Film ==
- Georges Auric – The Beauty and the Beast
- Hugo Friedhofer – The Best Years of Our Lives
- Bernard Herrmann – Anna and the King of Siam
- Erich Wolfgang Korngold – Deception
- Erich Wofgang Korngold – Devotion
- Erich Wolfgang Korngold – Of Human Bondage
- Miklós Rózsa – The Killers
- Max Steiner – The Big Sleep
- Dimitri Tiomkin – It's a Wonderful Life

== Musical theater ==
- Annie Get Your Gun (Irving Berlin) – Broadway production opened at the Imperial Theatre on May 16 and ran for 1147 performances
- Around the World ( Music and Lyrics: Cole Porter Book: Orson Welles) Broadway production opened at the Adelphi Theatre on May 31 and ran for 75 performances
- Beggar's Holiday opened at the Broadway Theatre on December 26 and ran for 111 performances
- Burlesque Broadway revival opened at the Belasco Theatre on December 25 and ran for 439 performances
- Call Me Mister Broadway revue opened at the National Theatre on April 18 and ran for 734 performances
- Lute Song ( music: Raymond Scott lyrics Bernie Hanighen) Broadway production opened at the Plymouth Theatre on February 6 and ran for 146 performances
- Show Boat (Jerome Kern and Oscar Hammerstein II) – Broadway revival opened at the Ziegfeld Theatre on January 5 and ran for 418 performances
- Song of Norway London production opened at the Palace Theatre on March 7 and ran for 526 performances
- St. Louis Woman Broadway production opened at the Martin Beck Theatre on March 30 and ran for 113 performances
- Sweetest And Lowest London revue opened at the Ambassadors Theatre on May 9 and ran for 791 performances
- Three to Make Ready Broadway revue opened at the Adelphi Theatre (New York) on March 7 and ran for 327 performances.
- Yours Is My Heart Broadway production opened on September 5 at the Shubert Theatre and ran for 36 performances

== Musical films ==
- The Bamboo Blonde starring Frances Langford
- Breakfast in Hollywood starring Tom Breneman, Bonita Granville, Billie Burke and Zasu Pitts and featuring Andy Russell, The King Cole Trio and Spike Jones and his City Slickers. Directed by Harold D. Schuster.
- Cinderella Jones starring Joan Leslie, Robert Alda, S. Z. Sakall and Edward Everett Horton. Directed by Busby Berkeley.
- Do You Love Me released May 17, starring Maureen O'Hara, Dick Haymes and featuring Harry James and his Music Makers.
- Doll Face starring Vivian Blaine and Dennis O'Keefe and featuring Perry Como and Carmen Miranda. Directed by Lewis Seiler.
- Earl Carroll Sketchbook starring Constance Moore, William Marshall and Edward Everett Horton
- Easy to Wed starring Esther Williams, Van Johnson, Lucille Ball and Keenan Wynn. Directed by Eddie Buzzell.
- Gaiety George released July 22 starring Richard Greene and Ann Todd.
- The Harvey Girls
- Holiday in Mexico starring Jane Powell, José Iturbi, Walter Pidgeon, Roddy McDowall, Ilona Massey and Xavier Cugat. Directed by George Sidney.
- The Jolson Story
- London Town released September 30 starring Sid Fields, Greta Gynt, Petula Clark, Kay Kendall and Sonny Hale and featuring Tessie O'Shea and Beryl Davis.
- No Leave, No Love starring Van Johnson, Pat Kirkwood, Keenan Wynn and Marie Wilson, and featuring Xavier Cugat & his Orchestra and Guy Lombardo and his Orchestra. Directed by Charles Martin.
- Song of the South
- St. Louis Woman
- Susie Steps Out starring David Bruce, Cleatus Caldwell and Margaret Dumont. Directed by Reginald LeBorg.
- Sweetheart of Sigma Chi starring Phil Regan, Elyse Knox and Phil Brito and featuring Frankie Carle & his Orchestra
- Swing Parade of 1946 starring Gale Storm, Phil Regan and The Three Stooges and featuring Connee Boswell and Louis Jordan. Directed by Phil Karlson.
- Tars and Spars starring Janet Blair, Alfred Drake and Sid Caesar.
- Three Little Girls in Blue starring June Haver, George Montgomery, Vivian Blaine, Celeste Holm and Vera Ellen. Directed by Bruce Humberstone.
- Till the Clouds Roll By
- The Time, the Place and the Girl released on December 28 starring Dennis Morgan, Jack Carson, Janis Paige and Martha Vickers.
- Ziegfeld Follies starring Fred Astaire, Lucille Ball, Lucille Bremer, Fanny Brice, Judy Garland, Kathryn Grayson, Lena Horne, Gene Kelly and Red Skelton. Directed by Vincente Minnelli.

== Births ==
- January 1 – Susannah McCorkle, American singer (died 2001)
- January 3 – John Paul Jones, born John Baldwin, rock musician (Led Zeppelin)
- January 4 – Arthur Conley, soul singer (died 2003)
- January 6 – Syd Barrett, born Roger Barrett, rock singer-songwriter (Pink Floyd) (died 2006)
- January 7
  - Andy Brown, drummer (The Fortunes)
  - Jann Wenner, publisher of Rolling Stone magazine
- January 8
  - Robby Krieger, rock guitarist and singer-songwriter (The Doors)
  - Elijah Moshinsky, opera director (died 2021)
- January 9 – Nihal Nelson, Sri Lankan singer-songwriter (died 2022)
- January 10 – Aynsley Dunbar, drummer (Jefferson Starship, Journey)
- January 11
  - Naomi Judd, country singer-songwriter (died 2022)
  - Tony Kaye, English keyboardist (Yes)
- January 16 – Katia Ricciarelli, operatic soprano
- January 19 – Dolly Parton, country singer-songwriter (died 2026)
- January 22 – Malcolm McLaren, impresario, founder of the Sex Pistols (died 2010)
- January 26 – Deon Jackson, soul singer (died 2014)
- January 27 – Nedra Talley, pop singer (The Ronettes) (died 2026)
- January 28 – Rick Allen, rock musician (Box Tops)
- January 31 – Terry Kath, rock guitarist and singer (Chicago) (died 1978)
- February 1 – Carol Neblett, operatic soprano
- February 6 – Kate McGarrigle, folk singer-aristsongwriter (died 2010)
- February 7 – Sammy Johns, country singer-songwriter (died 2013)
- February 13 – Colin Matthews, composer
- February 17 – Dodie Stevens, pop singer
- February 20 – J. Geils, rock guitarist (The J. Geils Band) (died 2017)
- February 23 – Rusty Young, country rock musician (Poco) (died 2021)
- February 24 – Jiří Bělohlávek, conductor (BBC Symphony Orchestra) (died 2017)
- March 1 – Tony Ashton, rock musician (Ashton, Gardner and Dyke) (died 2001)
- March 6
  - David Gilmour (Pink Floyd)
  - Tony Klatka (Blood, Sweat & Tears)
- March 7
  - Peter Wolf (The J. Geils Band)
  - Matthew Fisher (Procol Harum)
- March 8 – Randy Meisner, rock singer-songwriter and bassist (Poco, Eagles) (died 2023)
- March 12 – Liza Minnelli, singer and actress
- March 15 – Howard E. Scott (War)
- March 17
  - Harold Ray Brown (War)
  - Michael Finnissy, composer and pianist
- March 19
  - Paul Atkinson (The Zombies) (died 2004)
  - Ruth Pointer (The Pointer Sisters)
- March 21 – Ray Dorset (Mungo Jerry)
- March 22 – Harry Vanda (The Easybeats)
- March 24 – Colin Petersen, drummer (Bee Gees)
- March 26 – William Onyeabor, electronic funk musician
- March 27 – Andy Bown, (The Herd, Status Quo, Pink Floyd)
- April 1 – Ronnie Lane, singer-songwriter and guitarist (The Faces) (died 1997)
- April 3 – Dee Murray (Elton John Band)
- April 4 – Dave Hill (Slade)
- April 11 – Bob Harris, disc jockey
- April 13
  - Al Green, soul singer
  - Jim Pons (The Turtles, The Mothers of Invention)
- April 15 – Marsha Hunt, actress, singer and novelist
- April 16 – Pēteris Vasks, Latvian composer
- April 17 – Bill Kreutzmann (Grateful Dead)
- April 18
  - Lenny Baker (Sha Na Na)
  - Skip Spence (Jefferson Airplane, Moby Grape)
- April 19 – Tim Curry, English-American actor and singer (died 2026)
- May 1 – Jerry Weiss, jazz fusion trumpeter (Blood, Sweat & Tears)
- May 2 – Lesley Gore, singer (died 2015)
- May 9 – Clint Holmes, English-American singer-songwriter and game show host
- May 10
  - Donovan, folk singer
  - Graham Gouldman, art rock singer-songwriter (10cc)
  - Dave Mason, rock singer-songwriter (Traffic) (died 2026)
- May 11 – Plume Latraverse, Canadian singer-songwriter and guitarist
- May 16 – Robert Fripp, guitarist, composer and record producer
- May 20 – Cher, singer and actress
- May 24 – Steve Upton, drummer (Wishbone Ash)
- May 25 – Siegfried Fietz, song composer
- May 26 – Mick Ronson, guitarist (David Bowie), singer, songwriter, record producer (died 1993)
- June 1 – Jody Stecher, American singer
- June 3 – Eddie Holman, American singer and minister
- June 10 – Millie Small, singer (died 2020)
- June 11 – John Lawton (Uriah Heep) (died 2021)
- June 15
  - Noddy Holder, English vocalist (Slade)
  - Demis Roussos, Greek singer (died 2015)
- June 18 – Maria Bethânia, Brazilian singer (sister of Caetano Veloso)
- June 25
  - Ian McDonald, musician and record producer (King Crimson, Foreigner) (died in 2022)
  - Allen Lanier (Blue Öyster Cult) (died 2013)
- June 30
  - Billy Brown (The Moments)
  - Iain Matthews, singer-songwriter
- July 8 – Stella Chiweshe, Zimbabwean mbira player (died 2023)
- July 9 – Bon Scott, rock singer-songwriter (AC/DC) (died 1980)
- July 12 – Seán Keane, Irish traditional fiddler (The Chieftains) (died 2023)
- July 15 – Linda Ronstadt, singer
- July 19 – Alan Gorrie, R&B guitarist (Average White Band)
- July 21 – Barry Whitwam (Herman's Hermits)
- July 22
  - Mireille Mathieu, singer
  - Stephen M. Wolownik, American musicologist (died 2000)
- July 23 – Andy Mackay, saxophonist, oboist and composer
- July 24 – Alan Whitehead (Marmalade)
- July 28
  - Jonathan Edwards, folk musician and songwriter
  - Suzanne Stephens, clarinetist and basset-hornist
- July 30 – Jeffrey Hammond-Hammond (Jethro Tull)
- July 31
  - Gary Lewis (Gary Lewis & The Playboys)
  - Bob Welch (Fleetwood Mac) (died 2012)
- August 1
  - Boz Burrell, English singer-songwriter and guitarist (King Crimson, Bad Company) (died 2006)
  - Rick Coonce, American drummer (The Grass Roots) (died 2011)
- August 10 – Peter Karrie, Welsh star of West End musical productions
- August 14 – Larry Graham, American bassist and singer (Sly and the Family Stone)
- August 15 – Jimmy Webb, American songwriter
- August 19 – Beat Raaflaub, Swiss conductor
- August 23 – Keith Moon, English drummer (The Who) (died 1978)
- August 28 – Elena Mauti Nunziata, Italian soprano (died 2024)
- September 1 – Barry Gibb, singer-songwriter (Bee Gees)
- September 4
  - Gary Duncan (Quicksilver Messenger Service) (died 2019)
  - Greg Elmore (Quicksilver Messenger Service)
- September 5
  - Dean Ford, singer (Marmalade) (died 2018)
  - Freddie Mercury, lead singer (Queen) (died 1991)
  - Loudon Wainwright III, singer-songwriter, humorist and actor
- September 7 – Alfa Anderson, disco singer (Chic) (died 2024)
- September 9
  - Doug Ingle, rock singer-songwriter and keyboardist (founder of Iron Butterfly)
  - Bruce Palmer, folk rock bassist (Buffalo Springfield) (died 2004)
  - Billy Preston, singer and musician (died 2006)
- September 14 – Pete Agnew, rock bassist and backing vocalist (Nazareth)
- September 17 – Rhys Clark, New Zealand drummer
- September 18 – Alan "Bam" King, pop rock guitarist and singer (Ace)
- September 19 – John Coghlan, drummer (Status Quo)
- September 20 – Finbarr Dwyer, accordionist and fiddler (died 2014)
- September 22 – Law Kar-ying, Cantonese opera singer and actor
- September 24 – Jerry Donahue, folk rock guitarist (Fairport Convention)
- September 28 – Helen Shapiro, pop singer
- September 30 – Sylvia Peterson, pop singer (The Chiffons)
- October 10
  - John Prine, country folk singer-songwriter (died 2020)
  - Willard White, operatic bass-baritone
- October 11 – Gary Mallaber, drummer (Steve Miller Band)
- October 13 – Dorothy Moore, R&B singer
- October 14
  - Justin Hayward, guitarist and singer-songwriter (The Moody Blues)
  - Dan McCafferty, rock singer-songwriter (Nazareth) (died 2022)
- October 15 – Richard Carpenter, pop singer-songwriter (The Carpenters)
- October 18 – Howard Shore, film composer
- October 19 – Keith Reid, lyricist (Procol Harum) (died 2023)
- October 21 – Lee Loughnane, rock trumpeter (Chicago)
- October 26 – Keith Hopwood, pop singer-songwriter (Herman's Hermits)
- October 29 – Peter Green, blues rock guitarist and singer-songwriter (Fleetwood Mac) (died 2020)
- October 30
  - René Jacobs, conductor and countertenor singer
  - Chris Slade, rock drummer (AC/DC)
- November 1 – Ric Grech, vocalist & multi-instrumentalist (Blind Faith) (Family), bassist (Traffic) (died 1990)
- November 5
  - Herman Brood, Dutch rock 'n' roll artist (died 2001)
  - Gram Parsons, country musician (died 1973)
- November 8 – Roy Wood, singer-songwriter and multi-instrumentalist (The Move, Electric Light Orchestra, Wizzard)
- November 11 – Chip Hawkes, vocalist and guitarist (The Tremeloes)
- November 17 – Martin Barre, guitarist (Jethro Tull)
- November 20 – Duane Allman, lead & slide guitarist (The Allman Brothers Band) (died 1971)
- November 22 – Aston "Family Man" Barrett, reggae musician (Bob Marley and the Wailers) (died 2024)
- November 29 – Eamonn Campbell, guitarist & mandolin player (The Dubliners)
- December 1 – Gilbert O'Sullivan, singer-songwriter
- December 5
  - José Carreras, operatic tenor
  - Andy Kim, pop rock singer-songwriter
- December 6
  - Frankie Beverly, soul singer-songwriter and producer (Maze) (died 2024)
  - Emílio Santiago, singer (died 2013)
  - Dean Parks, American session guitarist
- December 10
  - Gloria Loring, American singer and actress
  - Walter Orange, American funk-soul vocalist-drummer (Commodores)
- December 12 – Clive Bunker, rock drummer (Jethro Tull)
- December 14 – Jane Birkin, actress and singer (died 2023)
- December 15 – Carmine Appice, rock drummer (Vanilla Fudge, Cactus)
- December 16
  - Benny Andersson, singer-songwriter (ABBA)
  - Trevor Pinnock, conductor and harpsichordist
- December 21
  - Christopher Keene, conductor (died 1995)
  - Kevin Peek, guitarist and songwriter (died 2013)
  - Carl Wilson, singer-songwriter and guitarist (The Beach Boys) (died 1998)
- December 23 – Edita Gruberová, opera singer
- December 24 – Jan Akkerman, guitarist (Focus)
- December 25 – Jimmy Buffett, singer-songwriter, author, businessman and film producer (died 2023)
- December 27 – Lenny Kaye, rock guitarist, composer and writer (Patti Smith Group)
- December 28 – Edgar Winter, multi-instrumentalist and singer
- December 29 – Marianne Faithfull, singer and actress (died 2025)
- December 30 – Patti Smith, poet and singer-songwriter

== Deaths ==
- January 7 – Adamo Didur, operatic bass, 77
- January 10 – Harry Von Tilzer, songwriter, 73
- January 18 – Lew Pollack, US composer, 50
- February 2 – Eduard Bass, singer and cabaret director, 58
- February 15 – Putney Dandridge, jazz musician, 44
- February 20 – Hugh Allen, organist and choral conductor, 76
- April 5 – Vincent Youmans, US composer, 47
- May 25 – Patty Hill, co-writer of "Happy Birthday to You", 78
- June 1 – Leo Slezak, operatic tenor, 72
- July 14 – Riley Puckett, country musician, 52 (blood poisoning)
- July 20 – Tricky Sam Nanton, trombonist, 42
- August 8 – Maria Barrientos, coloratura soprano, 63
- August 24 – Antonio Paoli, operatic tenor, 75
- August 31 – Paul von Klenau, Danish composer and conductor, 63
- September 3 – Moriz Rosenthal, pianist, 83
- September 4 – Paul Lincke, composer, 79
- September 15 – Cornel Simanjuntak classical composer, 25
- September 16 – Mamie Smith, vaudeville singer, dancer, pianist and actress, 63
- October 9 – Enrica Clay Dillon, American opera singer, opera director, and voice teacher, 65
- October 12 – Giuseppe Adami, opera librettist, 67
- October 16 – Sir Granville Bantock, composer, 78
- November 5 – Zygmunt Stojowski, composer and pianist, 76
- November 14 – Manuel de Falla, composer, 69
- November 30 – Albert Gumble, ragtime composer, 63
- December 6 – Maximilian Steinberg, composer and teacher, 63
- December 28 – Carrie Jacobs-Bond, US songwriter, 84
- December 30 – Charles Wakefield Cadman, composer, 65

=== Date unknown ===
- Teddy Brown, xylophone player (born 1900)
- Armanda Degli Abbati, Italian opera singer (born 1879)
- George De Cairos Rego, Australian composer and music professor (born 1858)
- Albert Bokhare Saunders, Australian composer (born 1880)
