= List of Most Played Juke Box Race Records number ones of 1946 =

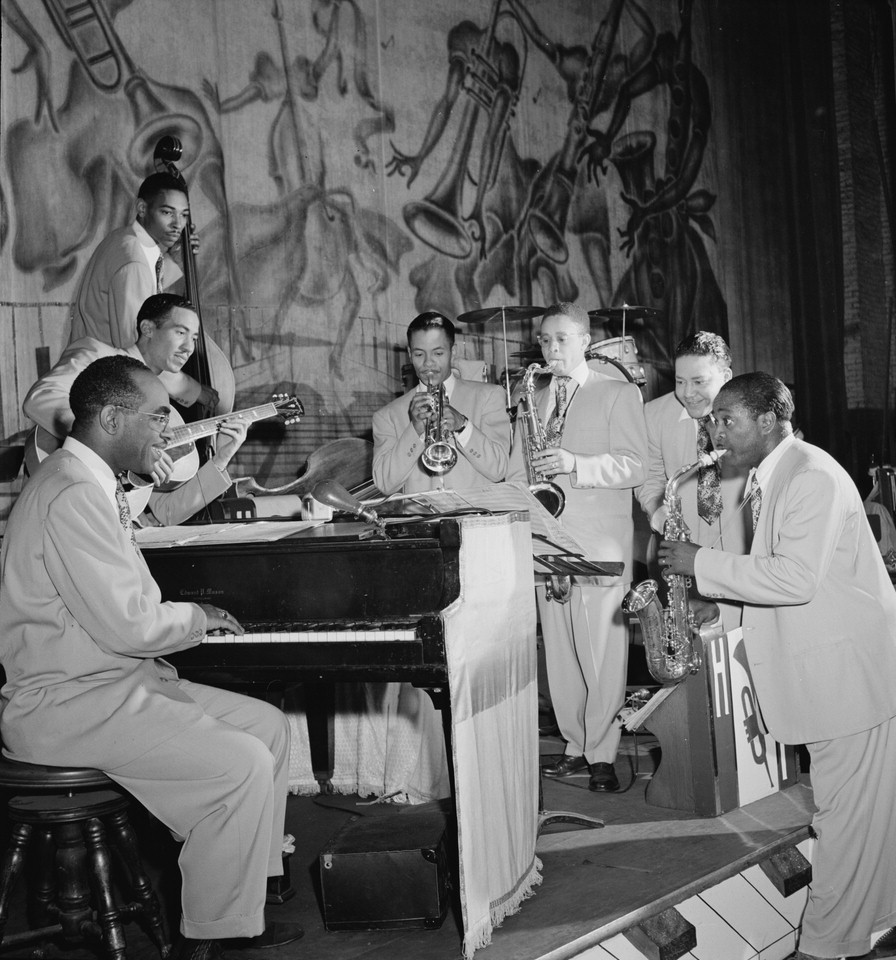
Louis Jordan (far right) and his Tympany Five had five number ones in 1946.

In 1946, Billboard magazine published a chart ranking the top-performing songs in the United States in African-American-oriented musical genres under the title of Most-Played Juke Box Race Records. The chart is considered to be part of the lineage of the magazine's multimetric R&B chart, which since 2005 has been published under the title Hot R&B/Hip Hop Songs. The term "race records" was then in common usage for recordings by black artists.

In the issue of Billboard dated January 5, Joe Liggins and his Honeydrippers were at number one with "The Honeydripper" (Parts 1 & 2). The track had spent 17 weeks at number one in 1945 and thus achieved a final total of 18 weeks at number one, a new record for an R&B chart-topper. Louis Jordan and his Tympany Five equalled the record in the final issue of 1946 when their song "Choo Choo Ch'Boogie" spent an 18th week in the top spot. The record would also be equalled by Drake's "One Dance" in 2016 but not broken until "Old Town Road" by Lil Nas X spent a 19th week atop the modern Hot R&B/Hip Hop Songs chart in 2019. Jordan dominated the top of the chart during 1946, spending a total of 34 weeks in the top spot (including two in which he tied for number one with another act) with five songs, one of which was a collaboration with singer Ella Fitzgerald.

The longest unbroken run at number one in 1946 was achieved by vibraphone player Lionel Hampton and his Orchestra, who spent 14 consecutive weeks in the top spot with "Hey! Ba-Ba-Re-Bop", including one tied week. In June, pioneering black vocal harmony group the Ink Spots achieved their fifth and final number one with "The Gypsy"; the song also reached the top spot on the all-genre Best-Selling Popular Retail Records, Records Most-Played on the Air and Most-Played Juke Box Records charts. The year's final number one was Jordan's "Choo Choo Ch'Boogie"; including his collaboration with Fitzgerald, Jordan had occupied the top spot without interruption since July. He was by far the most successful artist of the 1940s on Billboard's R&B charts. His tally of 18 chart-toppers was a record which would stand until the 1980s, and he spent 113 weeks at number one,^{[a]} a record which would still stand in the 21st century. Jordan's success fell away in the 1950s, but his music is considered to have been hugely influential on the development of both R&B and rock and roll.

== Chart history ==
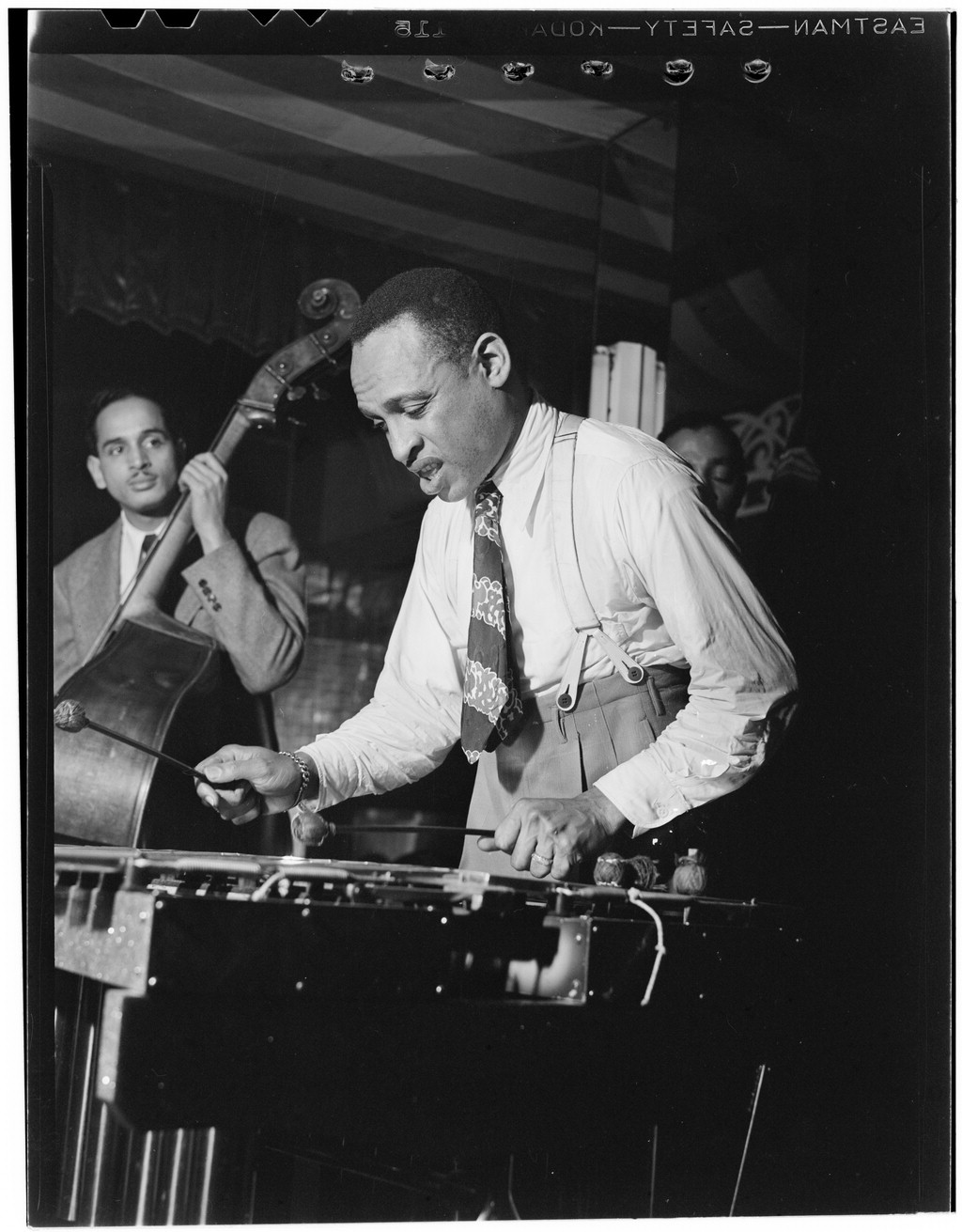
"Hey! Ba-Ba-Re-Bop" was a long-running number one for Lionel Hampton and his Orchestra.

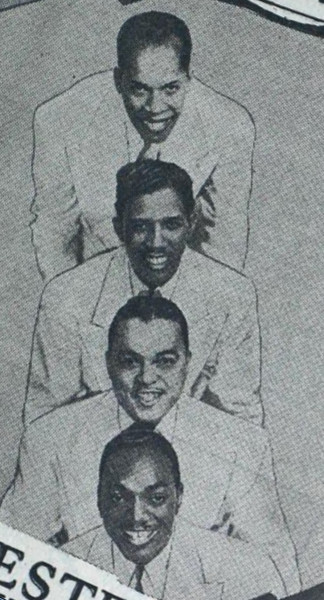
The Ink Spots topped the chart with "The Gypsy".

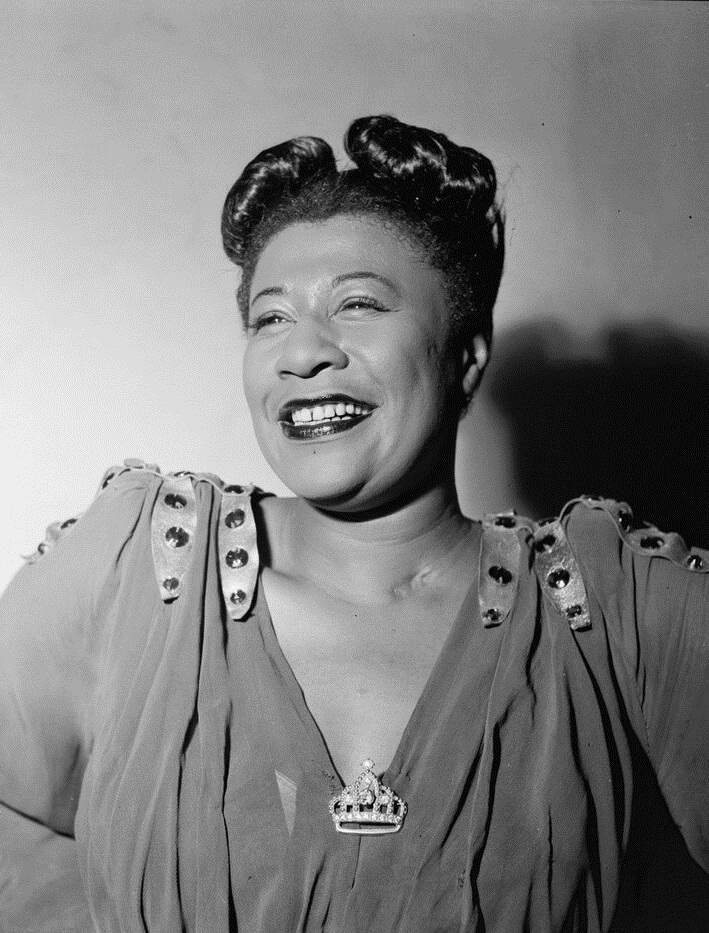
Ella Fitzgerald collaborated with Louis Jordan on the chart-topper "Stone Cold Dead in the Market".

Chart history
Issue date	Title	Artist(s)	Ref.
January 5	"The Honeydripper" (Parts 1 & 2)	Joe Liggins and his Honeydrippers	
January 12	"Buzz Me"	Louis Jordan and his Tympany Five	
January 19	"Buzz Me"	Louis Jordan and his Tympany Five	
January 26	"Buzz Me"	Louis Jordan and his Tympany Five	
February 2	"Buzz Me"	Louis Jordan and his Tympany Five	
February 9	"Buzz Me"	Louis Jordan and his Tympany Five	
February 16	"Buzz Me"	Louis Jordan and his Tympany Five	
February 23	"Buzz Me"	Louis Jordan and his Tympany Five	
March 2	"Buzz Me"	Louis Jordan and his Tympany Five	
March 9	"Buzz Me"	Louis Jordan and his Tympany Five	
March 16	"Hey! Ba-Ba-Re-Bop"	Lionel Hampton and his Orchestra	
March 23^{[b]}	"Don’t Worry 'bout That Mule"	Louis Jordan and his Tympany Five	
March 23^{[b]}	"Hey! Ba-Ba-Re-Bop"	Lionel Hampton and his Orchestra	
March 30	"Hey! Ba-Ba-Re-Bop"	Lionel Hampton and his Orchestra	
April 6	"Hey! Ba-Ba-Re-Bop"	Lionel Hampton and his Orchestra	
April 13	"Hey! Ba-Ba-Re-Bop"	Lionel Hampton and his Orchestra	
April 20	"Hey! Ba-Ba-Re-Bop"	Lionel Hampton and his Orchestra	
April 27	"Hey! Ba-Ba-Re-Bop"	Lionel Hampton and his Orchestra	
May 4	"Hey! Ba-Ba-Re-Bop"	Lionel Hampton and his Orchestra	
May 11	"Hey! Ba-Ba-Re-Bop"	Lionel Hampton and his Orchestra	
May 18	"Hey! Ba-Ba-Re-Bop"	Lionel Hampton and his Orchestra	
May 25	"Hey! Ba-Ba-Re-Bop"	Lionel Hampton and his Orchestra	
June 1	"Hey! Ba-Ba-Re-Bop"	Lionel Hampton and his Orchestra	
June 8	"Hey! Ba-Ba-Re-Bop"	Lionel Hampton and his Orchestra	
June 15	"Hey! Ba-Ba-Re-Bop"	Lionel Hampton and his Orchestra	
June 22	"Hey! Ba-Ba-Re-Bop"	Lionel Hampton and his Orchestra	
June 29	"The Gypsy"	The Ink Spots	
July 6	"Hey! Ba-Ba-Re-Bop"	Lionel Hampton and his Orchestra	
July 13	"The Gypsy"	The Ink Spots	
July 20^{[b]}	"Stone Cold Dead in the Market"	Ella Fitzgerald and Louis Jordan and his Tympany Five	
July 20^{[b]}	"The Gypsy"	The Ink Spots	
July 27	"Stone Cold Dead in the Market"	Ella Fitzgerald and Louis Jordan and his Tympany Five	
August 3	"Stone Cold Dead in the Market"	Ella Fitzgerald and Louis Jordan and his Tympany Five	
August 10	"Stone Cold Dead in the Market"	Ella Fitzgerald and Louis Jordan and his Tympany Five	
August 17	"Stone Cold Dead in the Market"	Ella Fitzgerald and Louis Jordan and his Tympany Five	
August 24	"Choo Choo Ch'Boogie"	Louis Jordan and his Tympany Five	
August 31	"Choo Choo Ch'Boogie"	Louis Jordan and his Tympany Five	
September 7	"Choo Choo Ch'Boogie"	Louis Jordan and his Tympany Five	
September 14	"Choo Choo Ch'Boogie"	Louis Jordan and his Tympany Five	
September 21	"Choo Choo Ch'Boogie"	Louis Jordan and his Tympany Five	
September 28	"Choo Choo Ch'Boogie"	Louis Jordan and his Tympany Five	
October 5	"Choo Choo Ch'Boogie"	Louis Jordan and his Tympany Five	
October 12	"Choo Choo Ch'Boogie"	Louis Jordan and his Tympany Five	
October 19	"Choo Choo Ch'Boogie"	Louis Jordan and his Tympany Five	
October 26	"Choo Choo Ch'Boogie"	Louis Jordan and his Tympany Five	
November 2	"Choo Choo Ch'Boogie"	Louis Jordan and his Tympany Five	
November 9	"Choo Choo Ch'Boogie"	Louis Jordan and his Tympany Five	
November 16	"Choo Choo Ch'Boogie"	Louis Jordan and his Tympany Five	
November 23	"Ain't That Just Like a Woman"	Louis Jordan and his Tympany Five	
November 30	"Choo Choo Ch'Boogie"	Louis Jordan and his Tympany Five	
December 7	"Choo Choo Ch'Boogie"	Louis Jordan and his Tympany Five	
December 14	"Choo Choo Ch'Boogie"	Louis Jordan and his Tympany Five	
December 21	"Choo Choo Ch'Boogie"	Louis Jordan and his Tympany Five	
December 28	"Choo Choo Ch'Boogie"	Louis Jordan and his Tympany Five	

== Notes ==
a. Jordan's first 16 number ones occurred at a time when Billboard published only one R&B chart. His final two number ones occurred during a period when the magazine published two charts and each topped both listings, but the figure of 113 weeks at number one does not double-count weeks when he topped both.
b. Two songs tied for the number one position.
