= String Quartet No. 10 =

String Quartet No. 10 may refer to:

- String Quartet No. 10 (Beethoven), Harp by Ludwig van Beethoven
- String Quartet No. 10 (Diamond) by David Diamond
- String Quartet No. 10 (Dvořák), Slavonic by Antonín Dvořák
- String Quartet No. 10 (Hill) by Alfred Hill
- String Quartet No. 10 (Maconchy) by Elizabeth Maconchy
- String Quartet No. 10 (Milhaud), Anniversaire, Op. 218, by Darius Milhaud
- String Quartet No. 10 (Mozart) by Wolfgang Amadeus Mozart
- String Quartet No. 10 (Rihm) by Wolfgang Rihm
- String Quartet No. 10 (Schubert) by Franz Schubert
- String Quartet No. 10 (Shostakovich) by Dmitri Shostakovich
- String Quartet No. 10 (Spohr) by Louis Spohr
- String Quartet No. 10 (Villa-Lobos) by Heitor Villa-Lobos
