= Nunziata =

Nunziata is a surname of Italian origin. The name refers to:

- Carmine Nunziata (born 1967), Italian football manager
- Elena Mauti Nunziata (1946–2024), Italian opera singer
- Frances Nunziata, Canadian politician from Ontario; city councillor of Toronto
- John Nunziata (born 1955), Canadian lawyer and politician
