= Carl Hogan =

American jazz musician

Carl D. Hogan (October 15, 1917 – July 8, 1977) was an American jazz and rhythm and blues guitarist and bassist. He is known for playing the lead guitar riff on Louis Jordan's "Ain't That Just Like a Woman (They'll Do It Every Time)" which was later imitated by Chuck Berry for his hit "Johnny B. Goode".

== Early life and career ==
Hogan was born to Broadus Henry Hogan and his wife Luerena, possibly in Louina, Alabama. He spent time as a child in Tallapoosa and Atlanta, and also in Pensacola, Florida where his father was a preacher. Census records describe the family as "mulatto". Other sources state that he was raised in St. Louis, Missouri. By 1940 he was living in Conway, Arkansas. His early musical career included stints on guitar and bass with the Jeter-Pillars Orchestra and George Hudson's Orchestra.

Hogan was recruited to join Louis Jordan's Tympany Five as a temporary bass player. Jordan had wanted Po Simkins as a bassist, however Simkins was unable to give Jordan his release date from the US Armed Forces and as a result until Simkins was discharged from the military, Hogan filled in as Jordan's bassist. With Jordan's band, Hogan appeared on the soundtracks to Look Out Sister (1946), Beware (1946), and Reet, Petite, and Gone (1948). He performed on numerous recordings with Jordan, including "Choo Choo Ch'Boogie", "Don't Worry 'Bout That Mule", "Ain't That Just Like a Woman (They'll Do It Every Time)", "Ain't Nobody Here But Us Chickens", "Jack, You're Dead", "Let the Good Times Roll", "Open the Door, Richard", "Boogie Woogie Blue Plate", and "Early in the Mornin'". On 1946's "Ain't That Just Like a Woman (They'll Do It Every Time)", Hogan first recorded the guitar riff that was to become "the most famous signature in rock 'n' roll".

Hogan continued to record with Jordan and the Tympany Five until 1949.

== Influence ==
Chuck Berry used Hogan's riff in 1958 – almost note-for-note – as the introduction to "Johnny B. Goode". Berry also used a similar riff in "Roll Over Beethoven", released one year earlier. On describing his use of the riff, Berry said:

The first time I heard [the riff] was in one of Carl Hogan's riffs in Louis Jordan's band. We have T-Bone Walker; I love [his] slurs he's bluesy. So put a little Carl Hogan, a little T-Bone Walker, and a little Charlie Christian together, and look what a span of people that you will please! And making it simple is another important factor ... in being able to play my music. If you can call it my music. Ain't nothing new under the sun.

== Death ==
Hogan died in St. Louis in 1977, aged 59.
