= Mauti =

Mauti is a surname. Notable people with the surname include:

- Elena Mauti Nunziata (1946–2024), Italian soprano singer
- Michael Mauti (born 1990), American football player
- Rich Mauti (born 1954), American football player
