= Laughing on the Outside (Crying on the Inside) =

1946 song by Bernie Wayne

"Laughing on the Outside (Crying on the Inside)" is a popular song. The music was written by Bernie Wayne, the lyrics by Ben Raleigh. The song was published in 1946.

Three versions were popular in 1946: by Dinah Shore, by Andy Russell, and by Sammy Kaye and his Orchestra (with vocal by Billy Williams).

The recording by Dinah Shore was released by Columbia Records as catalog number 36964. It first reached the Billboard charts on April 18, 1946, and lasted nine weeks on the chart, peaking at #3. This version was one side of a two-sided hit, the other side being the #2 hit, "The Gypsy."

The recording by Andy Russell was released by Capitol Records as catalog number 252. It first reached the Billboard charts on May 2, 1946, and lasted seven weeks on the chart, peaking at #4. It was the B-side of They Say It's Wonderful.

The recording by Sammy Kaye was released by RCA Victor under catalog number 20-1856. It first reached the Billboard charts on May 16, 1946, and lasted four weeks on the chart, peaking at #7.

Frances Irwin sings the song at the Danceland club (set) in the movie Gun Crazy, produced in 1949.

The Four Aces took it to #28 on the Cash Box singles chart in October 1953.

In 1959, the venerable R&B vocal group, The Harptones (featuring Willy Winfield) recorded a version for Morty Craft's Warwick Records.

In 1962, Ella Fitzgerald recorded it on her Rhythm Is My Business, and Aretha Franklin for her album "Laughing on the Outside".
