= Johnny B. Goode =

1958 single by Chuck Berry

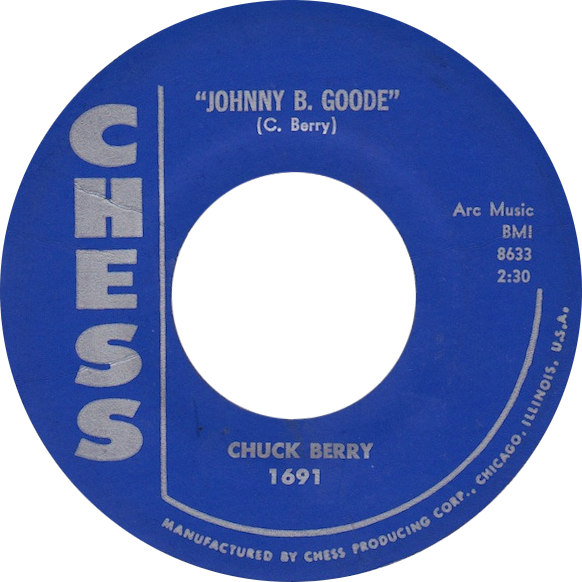
- Side-A labels of original US single

Single by Chuck Berry
- B-side: "Around and Around"
- Released: March 31, 1958
- Studio: Chess, Chicago
- Genre: Rock and roll
- Length: 2:39
- Label: Chess
- Songwriter: Chuck Berry
- Producers: Leonard Chess, Phil Chess

Chuck Berry singles chronology
"Sweet Little Sixteen" (1958)	"Johnny B. Goode" (1958)	"Beautiful Delilah" (1958)

Audio sample
- file; help

"Johnny B. Goode" is a song by American musician Chuck Berry, written and sung by Berry in 1958. Released as a single in 1958, it peaked at number two on the Hot R&B Sides chart and number eight on its pre-Billboard Hot 100 chart. The song remains a staple of rock n' roll music.

"Johnny B. Goode" is considered one of the most recognizable songs in the history of popular music. Credited as "the first rock & roll hit about rock & roll stardom", it has been covered by various other artists and has received several honors and accolades. These include being ranked 33rd and 7th, respectively, on Rolling Stone's 2021 and 2004 versions of 500 Greatest Songs of All Time. It was also included as one of the 27 songs on the Voyager Golden Record, a collection of music, images, and sounds designed to serve as an introduction and record of global humanity’s achievements, innovations and culture, to alien/otherworldly inhabitants.

== Composition and recording ==
Written by Chuck Berry in 1955, the song is about an illiterate "country boy" from the New Orleans area, who plays a guitar "just like ringing a bell", and who might one day have his "name in lights". Berry acknowledged that the song is partly autobiographical and that the original lyrics referred to Johnny as a "colored boy", but he changed it to "country boy" to ensure eligibility for radio play. As well as suggesting that the guitar player is good, the title hints at autobiographic elements, because Berry was born at 2520 Goode Avenue, in St. Louis.

The song was initially inspired by Johnnie Johnson, the regular piano player in Berry's band, but developed into a song mainly about Berry himself. Johnson played on many recordings by Berry, but for the Chess recording session Lafayette Leake played the piano, along with Willie Dixon on bass and Fred Below on drums. The session was produced by Leonard and Phil Chess. The guitarist Keith Richards later suggested that the song's chords are more typical of compositions written for piano than for guitar.

The opening guitar riff of "Johnny B. Goode" borrows from the opening single-note solo on Louis Jordan's "Ain't That Just Like a Woman" (1946), played by guitarist Carl Hogan. One notable feature of Berry's recording is the contrast between the swing of the drums and piano backing, and the "straight" (non-swinging) rhythm of the lead guitar.

== Legacy ==
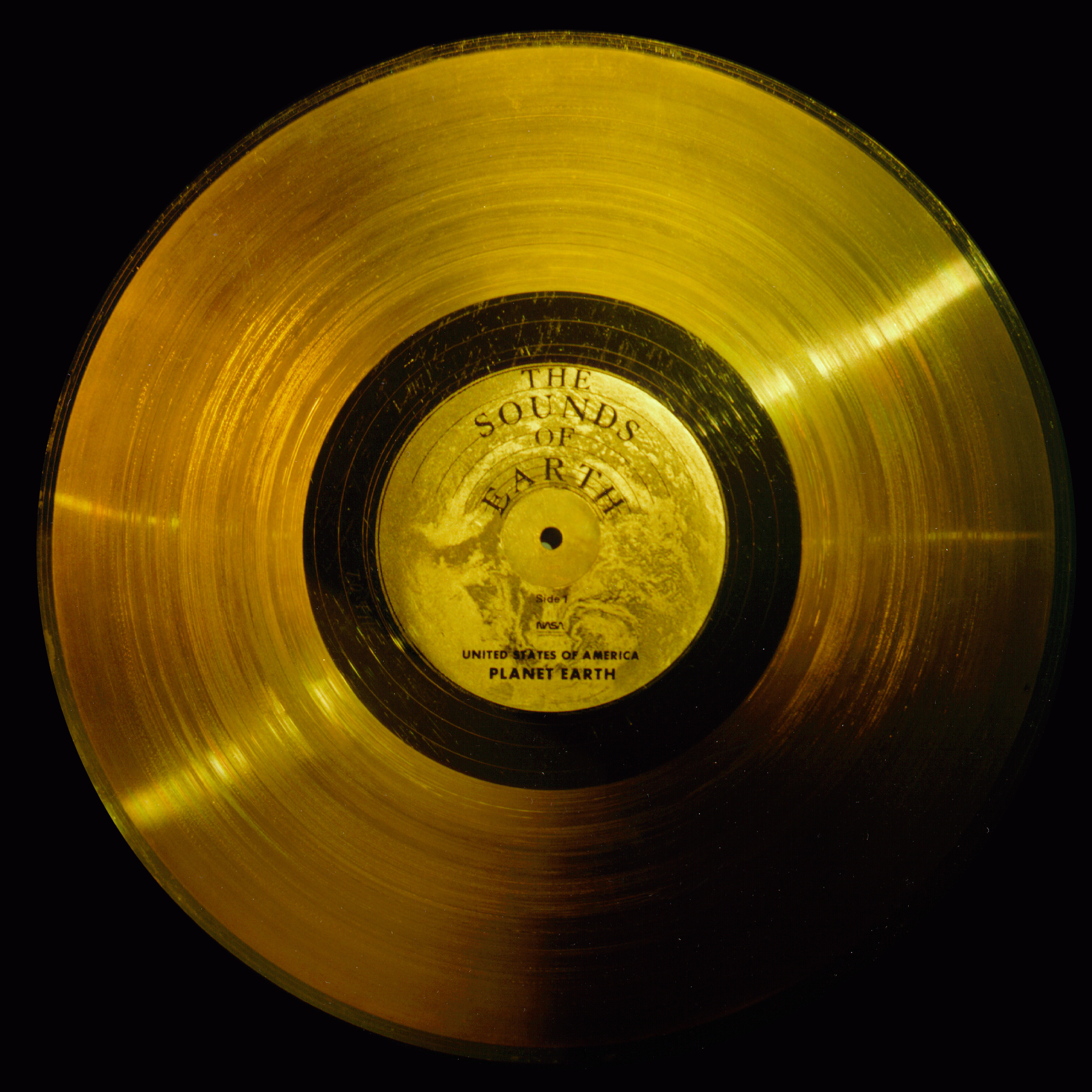
The Voyager Golden Record contains "Johnny B. Goode" among various musical pieces from many cultures.

In The Guardian, Joe Queenan argued that "no song in the history of rock'n'roll more jubilantly celebrates the downmarket socioeconomic roots of the genre" than "Johnny B. Goode". In Billboard, Jason Lipshutz stated that the song was "the first rock-star origin story", and that it featured "a swagger and showmanship that had not yet invaded radio".

When Chuck Berry was honored in the first Rock and Roll Hall of Fame induction ceremony on January 23, 1986, he performed "Johnny B. Goode" and "Rock and Roll Music", backed by Bruce Springsteen and the E Street Band. The Hall of Fame included both songs as well as "Maybellene" in their list of the 500 songs that shaped rock and roll. The song was inducted into the Grammy Hall of Fame in 1999, for its influence as a rock and roll single.

"Johnny B. Goode" has been recorded in cover versions by a wide variety of artists in different genres. In 1964, Dion DiMucci recorded a blues rock redition of the song that was released as the A-side to the single Chicago Blues. In 1969, country musician Buck Owens's version from his album Buck Owens in London "Live" topped Billboard magazine's Hot Country Sides chart. In 1972, Jimi Hendrix had a posthumous hit with a live version from the live album Hendrix in the West peaking at number 35 on the UK Singles Chart and later reaching number 13 on the New Zealand Top 50 in 1986.

The song appears on the 1973 American Graffiti soundtrack album. The Sex Pistols also covered it for their soundtrack The Great Rock 'n' Roll Swindle in 1979. Elton John's cover of the song is the opening track of his 1979 album Victim of Love. Peter Tosh's 1983 rendition from his album Mama Africa peaked at number 84 on the Billboard Hot 100, number 48 on the UK Singles Chart, number 10 in the Netherlands, and number 29 in New Zealand. In 1988, Judas Priest's version from their album Ram It Down reached number 64 on the UK Singles Chart.

Berry himself would release a sequel song to Johnny B. Goode titled "Bye Bye Johnny" for his 1960 album Rockin' at the Hops. The song's lyrics continue the story of Johnny B. Goode, in which Johnny, now grown up, leaves his childhood home in pursuit of stardom. This song would receive its own covers from bands such as The Rolling Stones. Devo paid homage to Berry's song in their song "Come Back Jonee" on the group's 1978 debut album Q. Are We Not Men? A: We Are Devo!. Berry's recording is included (as the eleventh track of disc 1) among the musical samples and sounds on the Voyager Golden Record, sent to travel into deep space beyond the Solar System on both Voyager spacecraft, launched in 1977.

A cover version is featured in the film Back to the Future (1985) when lead character Marty McFly, played by actor Michael J. Fox, performs it at a high school dance. Impressed, fictional bandleader Marvin Berry (Harry Waters Jr.) calls up his cousin Chuck and makes him listen to the song, telling him it is "that new sound you're looking for", thus making it a bootstrap paradox. Fox explained his approach was to "incorporate all the characteristics and mannerisms and quirks of my favourite guitarists, so a Pete Townshend windmill, and Jimi Hendrix behind the back, and a Chuck Berry duckwalk. And we worked all that in."

The Grateful Dead performed the song live, purportedly playing it at least 287 times from 7 September 1969 through 5 April 1995. The animated TV series Ninjago pays homage to "Johnny B. Goode" several times throughout the show with a track titled "Dareth the Guitar Man" (also known as "Dareth The Man" or "Dareth's Blues"), which features similar musical themes to the song.

In June 2026, CBS News included the song in its list of the 250 essential American songs of the past 250 years.

== Accolades ==
List	Publisher	Rank	Year of publication
500 Greatest Songs of All Time	Rolling Stone	7	2004
50 Greatest Guitar Solos	Guitar World	12	2009
100 Greatest Guitar Songs of All Time	Rolling Stone	1	2008
100 Greatest Guitar Tracks	Q	42	2005
500 Greatest Songs of All Time	Rolling Stone	33	2021
500 Songs That Shaped Rock	Rock and Roll Hall of Fame	N/A	1995

== Charts ==
Weekly charts
Chart (1958)	Peak position
US Billboard Hot 100	8
US Billboard Hot R&B Sides	2
US Cash Box Top 100	11

Chart (2017)	Peak position
US Hot Rock & Alternative Songs (Billboard)	9

== Certifications ==
Region	Certification	Certified units/sales
Denmark (IFPI Danmark)	Gold	45,000^{‡}
Italy (FIMI) sales since 2009	Gold	25,000^{‡}
New Zealand (RMNZ)	Platinum	30,000^{‡}
Spain (Promusicae) sales since 2009	Platinum	60,000^{‡}
United Kingdom (BPI)	Platinum	600,000^{‡}
United States (RIAA)	Platinum	1,000,000^{‡}
^{‡} Sales+streaming figures based on certification alone.

== See also ==
- Go, Johnny, Go! - 1959 film based on the song
- Johnny Be Good - 1988 film named after the song
