= Young Person's Guide to the Orchestra =

Classical TV series

The classical TV series Young Person's Guide to the Orchestra was created by orchestra conductor Leonard Bernstein, in 1960. Bernstein created the show for the purpose of exposing young viewers, mainly school-aged children, not just to European classical music, but to various kinds of orchestral instruments as well. It was a weekly show on CBS between 1958 and 1972. Then PBS picked up the show in 1972.
