= George De Cairos Rego =

Australian composer of light classical music

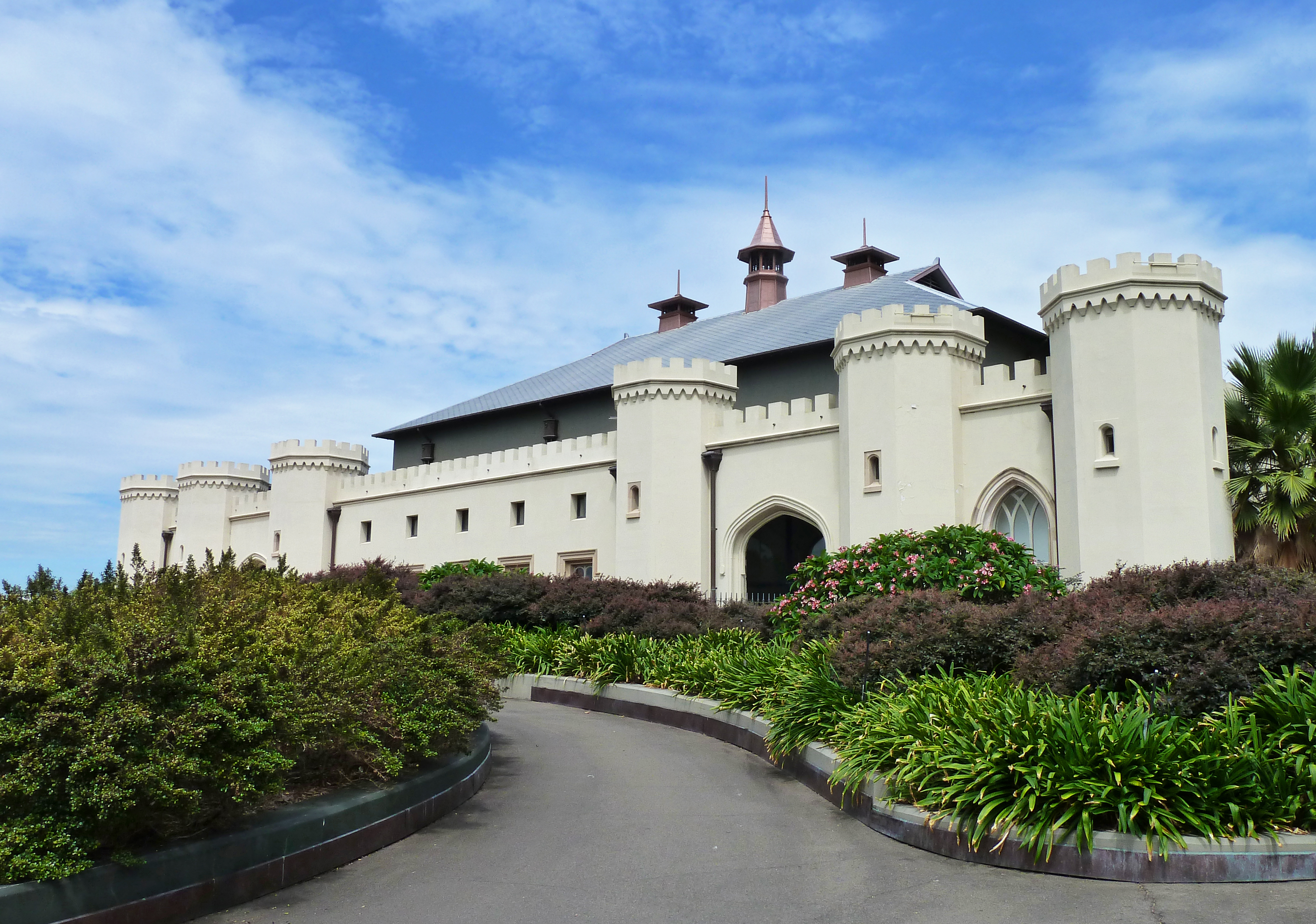
- Sydney Conservatorium where George De Cairos Rego taught music

Background information
- Born: January 1, 1858; Melbourne, Colony of Victoria
- Died: November 29, 1946 (aged 80)
- Occupations: Composer, conductor, teacher
- Years active: 1880–1915

'Inamorata melodie nuptiale for piano' 1913 by George De Cairos Rego (1858-1946)

George De Cairos Rego (1858–1946) was an Australian composer of light classical music. He was appointed to the inaugural staff of the Sydney Conservatorium of Music. He was born in Victoria but lived mostly in New South Wales.

De Cairos Rego wrote regular columns entitled 'Realm of Music' and 'World of music' for The Daily Telegraph (Sydney).

De Cairos Rego was well known as an organizer in musical circles, as a founder of the Musical Association of New South Wales in which he acted as secretary for his active years. He was also active in the Australian National Council of Music Associations.

His children Rex and Iris were also professional musicians. Iris became known as a pianist and composer in her own right.

A patent was issued in Britain and the United States Patent and Trademark Office for his invention of an electromagnetic vibrator, possibly to assist violinists with vibrato fingering. He also published research on the conversion of electricity into audible vibration and vice versa.

In 1902 he made a tour of the United States of America. De Cairos Rego survived his wife, Lilian Ada by more than ten years. Possibly this inspired his interest in Theosophy.

== Critical reception ==
A Commonwealth hymn, written for a national celebration of New Year's Eve, at federation of the Australian states, did not proceed as a choir performance, despite his considerable influence. He received a Licentiate in music from Trinity College London.

== Works ==
- 1898 Melba Waltz
- 1890 Dreaming
- 1906 La Cascade
- 1900 Moment Musicale
- 1892 Impromptu in F
- 1894 Inamorata: Wedding Melody for piano
- 1869 Fantasia on the tune 'Old Folks at Home'
