= Tympany Five =

American dance band

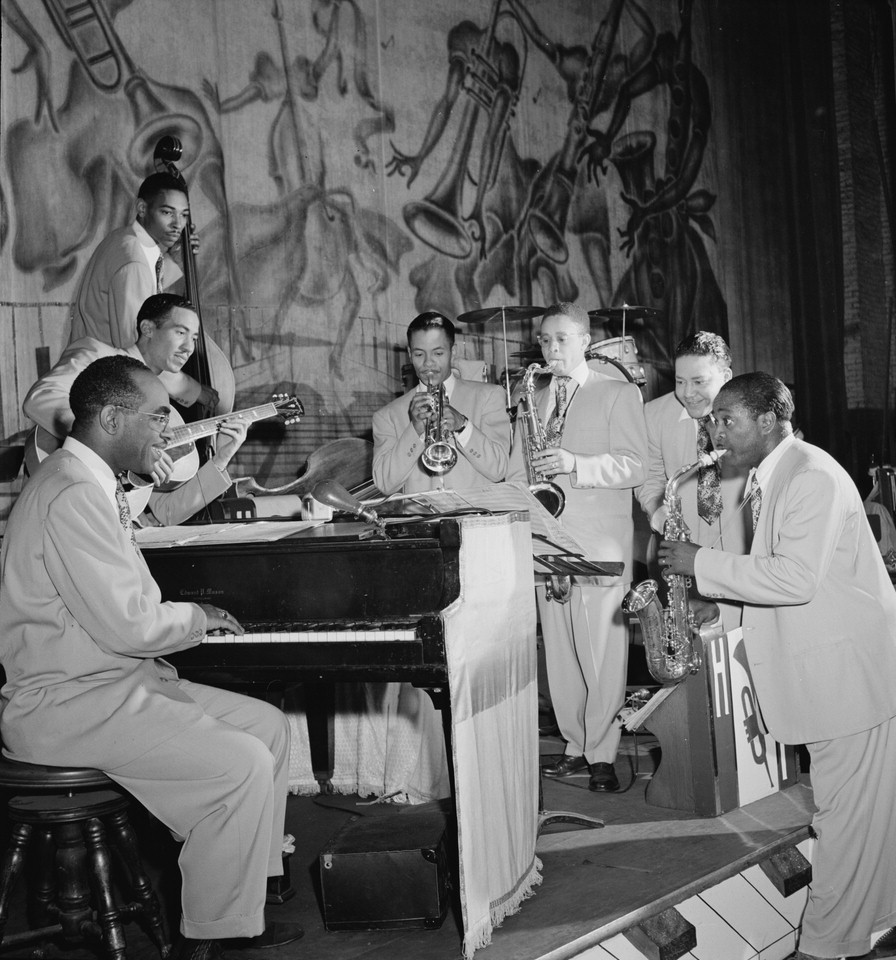
- Louis Jordan's Tympany Five in New York City, between 1946 and 1948
- Past members: Jimmy Peterson, piano and chief arranger

Tympany Five was a famous, successful, and influential American rhythm and blues and jazz dance band founded by Louis Jordan in 1938. The group was composed of a horn section of three to five different pieces and also drums, double bass, guitar and piano.

Louis Jordan and His Tympany Five created many of the most influential songs of the early R&B and rock and roll era, including "Let The Good Times Roll", "Keep A-Knockin'", and "Caldonia". Carl Hogan's opening guitar riff to "Ain't That Just Like A Woman" later became one of rock's most recognizable riffs in Chuck Berry's "Johnny B. Goode".

Jordan first formed the band as The Elks Rendezvous Band, named after the Elks Rendezvous jazz joint in Harlem. The original lineup of the sextet was Jordan (saxes, vocals), Courtney Williams (trumpet), Lem Johnson (tenor sax), Clarence Johnson (piano), Charlie Drayton (bass) and Walter Martin (drums). The various lineups of the Tympany Five (which often featured two or three extra players) included Bill Jennings and Carl Hogan on guitar, renowned pianist-arrangers Wild Bill Davis and Bill Doggett, Shadow Wilson and Chris Columbus on drums and Dallas Bartley on bass. Jordan played alto, tenor and baritone saxophone and sang the lead vocal on most numbers. The band found fame after opening for The Mills Brothers at the Capitol Lounge in Chicago in 1941.

In 1941, they were transferred from Decca's race label to its Sepia Series, featuring artists thought to have the crossover potential to appeal to both black and white audiences. Jordan was always proud of the fact that the Tympany Five's music was just as popular with white as it was with black people.

The Rock and Roll Hall of Fame states that two of the most important originators of rhythm and blues were Joe Turner and Louis Jordan, with his Tympany Five. The two artists helped to lay "the foundation for R&B in the 1940s, cutting one swinging rhythm & blues masterpiece after another". The Hall also describes Jordan as "the Father of Rhythm & Blues," "the Grandfather of Rock 'n' Roll" and "King of the Juke Boxes". The Blues Foundation also suggests that Jordan was a precursor to R&B: "Louis Jordan was the biggest African-American star of his era and that his 'Caldonia' reached "the top of the Race Records chart, as it was known prior to the introduction of term Rhythm & Blues in 1949".

His "Saturday Night Fish Fry" fell into the jump blues genre but is viewed by some as a precursor to rock and roll. In fact, Chuck Berry once commented about Jordan: He was "the first person I heard play rock and roll".

Jordan's last recordings were made for the French Black & Blue label in 1973 and issued as I Believe in Music. The session included Irv Cox tenor in saxophone, Duke Burrell on piano, bassist John Duke and drummer Archie Taylor.
