= The Gypsy (1945 song) =

1945 popular song

"The Gypsy" is a popular song written by Billy Reid and published in 1945. The ballad tells the story of a person who visits a Gypsy fortune teller and is reassured that their partner is faithful. Though they both know it to be untrue, the narrator resolves to return, "'Cause I want to believe the Gypsy".

== History ==
"The Gypsy" was originally introduced in the United Kingdom by Billy Reid's orchestra and vocalist Dorothy Squires, who was also his partner. In the United States, the song was recorded by Bill Kenny & The Ink Spots, Dinah Shore, and Sammy Kaye's orchestra, and was a hit for all three.

- The recording by The Ink Spots featuring Bill Kenny was released by Decca Records as catalog number 18817. It first reached the Billboard chart on May 2, 1946 and lasted 18 weeks on the listings, peaking at No. 1, and was also number one on the R&B charts for three non-consecutive weeks.
- The song was also recorded by Guy Lombardo featuring the female cabaret star Hildegarde singing. It was released by Decca Records as catalog number 23511 in March, 1946. This version was regarded as a musical "flop", however.
- The recording by Dinah Shore was released by Columbia Records as catalog number 36964. It first reached the Billboard charts on May 2, 1946 and lasted 15 weeks on the chart, peaking at No. 2. This recording was a two-sided hit, with the flip side, "Laughing on the Outside (Crying on the Inside)," reaching No. 3 the same year.
- The recording by Sammy Kaye was released by RCA Victor Records as catalog number 20-1844. It first reached the Billboard chart on May 9, 1946 and lasted 10 weeks on the chart, peaking at No. 4.

== Other recordings ==
- The Gypsy was also recorded by Charlie Parker on July 29, 1946, during the famous "Lover Man" session after which he was committed to the Camarillo State Mental Hospital in California.
- Louis Armstrong recorded the song with the Commanders in October, 1953 and it was released on Decca Records as catalog number 28995.
- Quincy Jones recorded the song on his 1959 album The Birth of a Band!.
- Frank Sinatra recorded the song on his 1962 album Sinatra Sings Great Songs from Great Britain.

== Popular culture ==
- The Ink Spots' recording of the song appears on the soundtrack of the 2008 film Revolutionary Road.

== See also ==
- Billboard Most-Played Race Records of 1946
