= String Quartet No. 10 (Villa-Lobos) =

Musical composition by Heitor Villa-Lobos

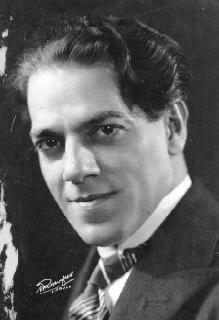
Heitor Villa-Lobos

String Quartet No. 10 is one of a series of 17 works in the genre by the Brazilian composer Heitor Villa-Lobos.

Villa-Lobos composed his Tenth Quartet in Rio de Janeiro in 1946. It was first performed by the Quarteto de São Paulo in Paris on 12 February 1950. The score is dedicated to Mindinha (Arminda Neves d'Almeida), the composer's companion for the last 23 years of his life.

A typical performance lasts approximately 23 minutes.

== Analysis ==
The quartet consists of four movements:

1. Poco animato
2. Adagio
3. Scherzo (Allegro vivace)
4. Molto allegro

The formal structure of the first movement is derived from the classical sonata-allegro form and has three subjects.

Cyclic procedures are used to promote unity across the four movements. A violin arpeggio flourish from the end of the fourth bar of the first movement, for example, is developed extensively in the Adagio, and the prominent repeated chords of the first movement return in the scherzo and, in slower rhythmic values, in portions of the finale.

== Discography ==
Chronological, by date of recording.

- Heitor Villa-Lobos: String Quartets Nos. 3, 10 and 15. Danubius Quartet (Gyöngyvér Oláh [Quartets 3 and 10], Judit Tóth [Quartet 15] and Adél Miklós, violins; Cecilia Bodolai, viola; Ilona Ribli, cello). Recorded at the Rottenbiller Street Studio in Budapest, 15–19 June and 1–2 July 1992. CD recording, 1 disc: digital, 12 cm, stereo. Marco Polo 8.223393. A co-production with Records International. Germany: HH International, Ltd., 1993.
- Heitor Villa-Lobos: Quartetos de cordas 7, 8, 9, 10, 11. Quarteto Amazônia. CD recording, 2 discs: digital, 12 cm, stereo. Barcelona: Discmedi D.L., 2000.
  - Also issued as part of Villa-Lobos: Os 17 quartetos de cordas / The 17 String Quartets. Quarteto Bessler-Reis and Quarteto Amazônia. CD recording, 6 sound discs: digital, 12 cm, stereo. Kuarup Discos KCX-1001 (KCD 045, M-KCD-034, KCD 080/1, KCD-051, KCD 042). Rio de Janeiro: Kuarup Discos, 1996.
- Villa-Lobos: String Quartets, Volume 5. Quartets Nos. 5, 10, 13. Cuarteto Latinoamericano (Saúl Bitrán, Arón Bitrán, violins; Javier Montiel, viola; Alvaro Bitrán, cello). Recorded at the Sala Blas Galindo of the Centro Nacional de las Artes in Mexico City, 24–28 January 2000. Music of Latin American Masters. CD recording, 1 disc: digital, 12 cm, stereo. Dorian DOR-93211. Troy, NY: Dorian Recordings, 2000.
  - Reissued as part of Heitor Villa-Lobos: The Complete String Quartets. 6 CDs + 1 DVD with a performance of Quartet No. 1 and interview with the Cuarteto Latinoamericano. Dorian Sono Luminus. DSL-90904. Winchester, VA: Sono Luminus, 2009.
  - Also reissued (without the DVD) on Brilliant Classics 6634.

== Filmography ==
- Villa-Lobos: A integral dos quartetos de cordas. Quarteto Radamés Gnattali (Carla Rincón, Francisco Roa, violins; Fernando Thebaldi, viola; Hugo Pilger, cello); presented by Turibio Santos. Recorded from June 2010 to September 2011 at the Palácio do Catete, Palácio das Laranjeiras, and the Theatro Municipal, Rio de Janeiro. DVD and Blu-ray (VIBD11111), 3 discs. Rio de Janeiro: Visom Digital, 2012.
