= Let the Good Times Roll (Louis Jordan song) =

1946 song by Louis Jordan

Single by Louis Jordan and His Tympany Five
- B-side: "Ain't Nobody Here but Us Chickens"
- Released: December 1946
- Recorded: New York City, June 26, 1946
- Genre: Jump blues
- Length: 2:45
- Label: Decca
- Songwriters: Sam Theard, Fleecie Moore

Official audio
- "Let the Good Times Roll" on YouTube

"Let the Good Times Roll" is a jump blues song recorded in 1946 by Louis Jordan and his Tympany Five. A mid-tempo twelve-bar blues, the song became a blues standard and one of Jordan's best-known songs.

== Composition ==
"Let the Good Times Roll" is "Louis Jordan's buoyant invitation to party":

Hey everybody, let's have some fun
You only live but once, and when you're dead you're done
So let the good times roll, let the good times roll
Don't care if you're young or old, get together let the good times roll

The song was written by Sam Theard, a New Orleans-born blues singer and songwriter, and was co-credited to Fleecie Moore, Jordan's wife. Theard first showed Jordan the song in 1942, while playing in Chicago clubs. The tune developed over the years until Jordan recorded it in New York City in June 1946.

== Charts and recognition ==
"Let the Good Times Roll" reached number two in the Billboard R&B chart in 1947. Its flip side, "Ain't Nobody Here but Us Chickens", was the top number one record of 1947 — both songs spent nearly six months on the chart. In 2009, the song was acknowledged with a Grammy Hall of Fame Award. Jordan and the Tympany Five performed the song in the 1947 film Reet, Petite, and Gone, although the studio recording rather than a live performance is used in the soundtrack.

The Blues Foundation added the song to its Hall of Fame in 2013 in the "Classic of Blues Recording — Singles or Album Tracks" category. The induction announcement noted that the song "became a standard show opener for countless blues artists over the years, from B.B. King to Koko Taylor". "Let the Good Times Roll" has also been identified as inspiring "Come On" by Earl King and "Bon Ton Roulet" by Clifton Chenier.

In 1961 at the 3rd Annual Grammy Awards ceremony, Ray Charles won the Grammy for Best Rhythm & Blues Performance for his version of "Let the Good Times Roll" which was included on his 1959 album, The Genius of Ray Charles.
