= Ain't That Just Like a Woman (They'll Do It Every Time) =

Jump blues song first recorded by Louis Jordan

"Ain't That Just Like a Woman (They'll Do It Every Time)" is a 1946 song written by Claude Demetrius and Fleecie Moore and recorded by Louis Jordan and Tympany Five. The song reached number one on the R&B Jukebox chart for two weeks and peaked at number seventeen on the pop chart. Chuck Berry, who acknowledged the influence of both Louis Jordan and Carl Hogan, copied the latter's guitar intro to the song for his 1958 classic "Johnny B. Goode".

In 1961, a version by Fats Domino was released as a double sided single, which reached number 33 on the US Billboard Hot 100 chart.

== See also ==
- Billboard Most-Played Race Records of 1946
