= Elena Mauti Nunziata =

Italian opera singer (1946–2024)

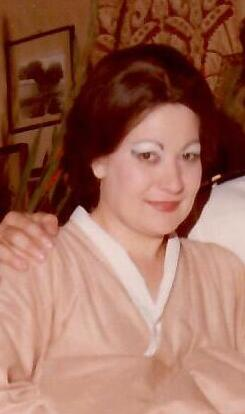
- Mauti Nunziata as Madame Butterfly, Torre del Lago 1977
- Born: 28 August 1946; Palma Campania, Italy
- Died: 16 July 2024 (aged 77); Monte Carlo, Monaco
- Education: Conservatorio San Pietro a Majella
- Occupation: Operatic soprano

Elena Mauti Nunziata (28 August 1946 – 22 July 2024) was an Italian operatic soprano. Her voice had spinto qualities, with a slightly dark timbre and an easy upper register. She gained international recognition with the title role in Verdi's La traviata at the Teatro Real in Madrid in 1977. At the Metropolitan Opera in New York City, she performed as Mimi in Puccini's La bohème, as La traviata, and as Nedda in Leoncavallo's Pagliacci.

== Life and career ==
Mauti Nunziata was born in Palma Campania on 28 August 1946. She studied voice at the Conservatorio San Pietro a Majella in Naples. At the studio of the Teatro Lirico Sperimentale in Palermo, she was trained by Gina Cigna and Ines Alfani Tellini. She made her unofficial debut in Sicily as Musetta in Puccini's La bohème. Her official debut was as Liù in Puccini's Turandot at the Teatro Massimo in Palermo in 1965.

Her first recognized success on the stage was as Elvira in Bellini's I puritani in Palermo. She performed the role also in her first appearance in the United States at the Dallas Opera in 1973. She performed at the Arena di Verona, where her voice carried well, between 1975 and 1985; first as Micaela in Bizet's Carmen, in 1977 as Nedda in Leoncavallo's Pagliacci alongside Plácido Domingo in the title role, in 1978 in the title role of Puccini's Madama Butterfly, and in 1985 as Leonora in Verdi's Il trovatore. She portrayed the title role in Verdi's La traviata in a remarkable 1977 production at the Teatro Real in Madrid. In 1976 she performed at La Scala in Milan as Liù, and returned in 1978 as Madama Butterfly, conducted by Georges Prêtre, and in 1981 as Nedda in Pagliacci.

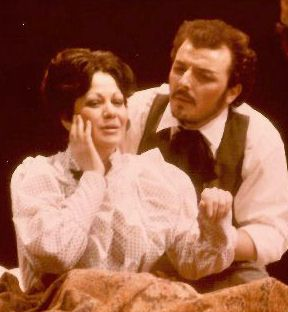
Mauti Nunziata as Mimi, Dallas Opera, 1976

Between 1977 and 1979, Mauti Nunziata appeared in 26 performances at the Metropolitan Opera in New York City, as Mimi in La bohème, as Violetta in La traviata and Nedda in Pagliacci. When she stepped in as Mimì for Mirella Freni, alongside Nicolai Gedda as Rodolfo, a reviewer from the New York Times described her lyric soprano as "a distinctive, vibrant instrument with a touch of hardness to it" and noted her "slender, eminently attractive Mimi", but missed more specific characterization. She appeared in 1978 as Madama Butterfly at the Paris Opera, stepping in for Teresa Żylis-Gara. She performed as a guest at the Lyric Opera of Chicago as Butterfly and as Gilda in Verdi's Rigoletto. In 1979 she appeared as Liù at the Opéra de Monte-Carlo. She performed the title role of Zandonai's Giulietta e Romeo as part of the 1986 Internationale Maifestspiele Wiesbaden. She portrayed Magda in Puccini's La rondine at the Teatro Comunale di Bologna in 1987. In 1991 she performed the title role of Zandonai's Francesca da Rimini and Sulamith in Goldmark's Die Königin von Saba at the Teatro Regio di Torino.

Her roles included Mozart's Fiordiligi in Così fan tutte and Elvira in Don Giovanni, Donizetti's Norina in Don Pasquale, Gounod's Marguerite in Faust, Massenet's Manon and Desdemona in Verdi's Otello. She also performed as Leonora in Verdi's La forza del destino, Leila in Bizet's Les pêcheurs de perles, Margherita in Boito's Mefistofele, and as Puccini's Tosca.

She retired in 1994, while in good vocal condition, with a farewell concert in Brescia, where she performed the end of the first act of La traviata.

=== Personal life ===
From the late 1970s, Mauti Nunziata took residence in Monte Carlo. She died there on 22 July 2024, at the age of 77.
