= Joe Jackson discography =

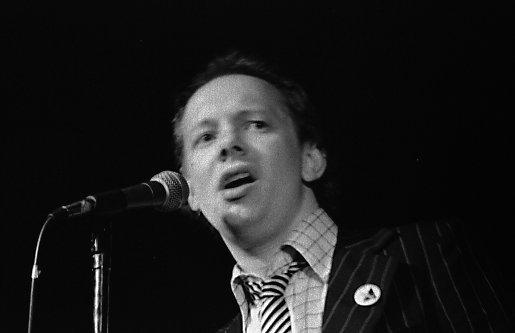
- Studio albums: 20
- Soundtrack albums: 2
- Live albums: 8
- Compilation albums: 16
- Singles: 58
- Video albums: 7
- Other singles: 14
- Box sets: 3

This page lists albums, singles, and compilations by the musician Joe Jackson. Jackson's recording career as a solo artist began in 1979, with the release of his debut album Look Sharp!. The album was recorded with the Joe Jackson Band, with whom he would release two more albums, I'm the Man and Beat Crazy, the latter of which was credited to the full band rather than simply Jackson.

Following Beat Crazy, Jackson broke up with his backing band and recorded a series of albums, ranging from cover albums (1981's Jumpin' Jive) to original studio albums (1982's Night and Day) and live albums (1986's Big World, an album of original material recorded live). He has also experimented with movie soundtracks and classical music. He reunited with the Joe Jackson Band for 2003's Volume 4 and has since recorded several more solo albums, the most recent being Hope and Fury in 2026.

== Albums ==
=== Studio albums ===
Title	Album details	Peak chart positions										Certifications
Title	Album details	UK	AUS	CAN	GER	IT	NL	NZ	SWE	SWI	US	Certifications
Look Sharp!	Released: January 1979; Label: A&M; Formats: LP, MC, 8-track	40	20	20	—	—	36	13	—	—	20	UK: Silver; CAN: Gold; NL: Gold; US: Gold
I'm the Man	Released: 5 October 1979; Label: A&M; Formats: LP, MC, 8-track	12	81	18	—	—	45	47	—	—	22	UK: Silver; CAN: Platinum
Beat Crazy (Note: Credited to the Joe Jackson Band.)	Released: 10 October 1980; Label: A&M; Formats: LP, MC, 8-track	42	82	26	—	—	32	47	—	—	41	
Joe Jackson's Jumpin' Jive (Note: Credited to Joe Jackson's Jumpin' Jive.)	Released: 19 June 1981; Label: A&M; Formats: LP, MC, 8-track	14	29	31	—	—	—	12	—	—	42	
Night and Day	Released: 25 June 1982; Label: A&M; Formats: LP, MC, 8-track	3	5	4	11	24	3	8	—	—	4	UK: Gold; AUS: Platinum; CAN: Platinum; NL: Platinum; NZ: Gold; US: Gold
Body and Soul	Released: 14 March 1984; Label: A&M; Formats: CD, LP, MC, 8-track	14	21	13	21	16	2	8	41	11	20	UK: Silver; CAN: Gold; NL: Platinum
Will Power	Released: April 1987; Label: A&M; Formats: CD, LP, MC	—	67	78	58	20	25	—	—	—	131	
Blaze of Glory	Released: 17 April 1989; Label: A&M; Formats: CD, LP, MC	36	31	43	27	20	12	—	—	22	61	
Laughter & Lust	Released: 29 April 1991; Label: Virgin; Formats: CD, LP, MC	41	57	43	20	24	22	—	—	17	116	
Night Music	Released: 3 October 1994; Label: Virgin; Formats: CD, MC	—	180	—	—	—	—	—	—	—	—	
Heaven & Hell (Note: Credited to Joe Jackson & Friends.)	Released: 2 September 1997; Label: Sony Classical; Formats: CD, MC	—	—	—	—	—	—	—	—	—	— (Note: Heaven & Hell did not enter the Billboard 200, but did peak at number 3 on the Classical Albums.)	
Symphony No. 1	Released: 4 October 1999; Label: Sony Classical; Formats: CD, MD	—	—	—	—	—	—	—	—	—	— (Note: Symphony No. 1 did not enter the Billboard 200, but did peak at number 18 on the Classical Albums.)	
Night and Day II	Released: 24 October 2000; Label: Sony Classical; Formats: CD, MD	—	—	—	—	—	65	—	—	—	—	
Volume 4	Released: 10 March 2003; Label: Rykodisc; Formats: CD, 2xCD	116	—	—	49	—	27	—	—	—	—	
Rain	Released: 28 January 2008; Label: Rykodisc; Formats: CD, CD+DVD, LP	154	—	—	44	—	12	—	—	99	133	
The Duke	Released: 22 June 2012; Label: earMUSIC, Razor & Tie; Formats: CD, LP, digital download	— (Note: The Duke did not enter the UK Albums Chart, but did peak at number 48 on the UK Independent Albums Chart.)	—	—	33	—	21	—	—	49	93	
Fast Forward	Released: 2 October 2015; Label: earMUSIC, Work Song; Formats: 2xCD, LP, digital download	168	—	—	54	—	11	—	—	—	— (Note: Fast Forward did not enter the Billboard 200, but did peak at number 99 on the Top Current Album Sales, number 45 on the Top Rock Albums and number 27 on the Independent Albums.)	
Fool	Released: 18 January 2019; Label: earMUSIC; Formats: 2xCD, LP, digital download	— (Note: Fool did not enter the UK Albums Chart, but did peak at number 13 on the UK Independent Albums Chart.)	—	—	11	—	13	—	—	16	— (Note: Fool did not enter the Billboard 200, but did peak at number 25 on the Top Album Sales, number 23 on the Top Current Album Sales and number 7 on the Independent Albums.)	
What a Racket!	Released: 24 November 2023; Label: earMUSIC; Formats: CD, LP, digital download	—	—	—	—	—	—	—	—	—	—	
Hope and Fury	Released: 10 April 2026; Label: earMUSIC; Formats: CD, LP, digital download	—	—	—	32	—	83	—	—	16	— (Note: Hope and Fury did not enter the Billboard 200, but peaked at number 30 on the Billboard Top Album Sales chart.)	
"—" denotes releases that did not chart or were not released in that territory.

=== Live albums ===
Title	Album details	Peak chart positions										Certifications
Title	Album details	UK	AUS	CAN	GER	IT	NL	NZ	SWE	SWI	US	Certifications
Big World	Released: 24 March 1986; Label: A&M; Formats: CD, 2xLP, MC	41	22	35	24	13	2	27	38	18	34	NL: Gold
Live 1980/86	Released: 25 April 1988; Label: A&M; Formats: 2xCD, 2xLP, 2xMC	66	17	92	52	18	8	13	—	—	91	NL: Gold
Summer in the City: Live in New York	Released: 16 May 2000; Label: Manticore/Sony Classical; Formats: CD, MD	—	—	—	—	—	—	—	—	—	—	
Two Rainy Nights	Released: January 2002; Label: Great Big Island; Formats: CD	—	—	—	—	—	—	—	—	—	—	
Afterlife	Released: 15 March 2004; Label: Rykodisc; Formats: CD, 2xCD	—	—	—	—	—	87	—	—	—	—	
Live Music – Europe 2010 (Note: Credited to the Joe Jackson Trio.)	Released: 3 June 2011; Label: earMUSIC, Razor & Tie; Formats: CD, digital download	—	—	—	—	—	—	—	—	—	—	
Live at Rockpalast	Released: 30 March 2012; Label: MIG; Formats: 2xCD	—	—	—	—	—	—	—	—	—	—	
State Theater New Jersey 2005 (Note: With Todd Rundgren and Ethel.)	Released: 18 June 2021; Label: Purple Pyramid; Formats: 2xCD+DVD, 3xLP, digital download	—	—	—	—	—	—	—	—	—	—	
"—" denotes releases that did not chart or were not released in that territory.

=== Soundtrack albums ===
Title	Album details	Peak chart positions			
Title	Album details	AUS	NL	NZ	US
Mike's Murder	Released: September 1983; Label: A&M; Formats: LP, MC	91	10	28	64
Tucker	Released: August 1988; Label: A&M; Formats: CD, LP, MC	—	99	—	—
"—" denotes releases that did not chart or were not released in that territory.

=== Compilation albums ===
Title	Album details	Peak chart positions				Certifications
Title	Album details	UK	AUS	GER	NL	Certifications
Stepping Out: The Very Best of Joe Jackson	Released: 3 September 1990; Label: A&M; Formats: CD, LP, MC	7	13	78	45	UK: Gold
Greatest Hits	Released: 7 May 1996; Label: A&M; Formats: CD, MC	—	—	—	—	
This Is It! (The A&M Years 1979–1989)	Released: March 1997; Label: A&M; Formats: 2xCD	—	—	—	—	
Master Series	Released: September 1997; Label: A&M; Formats: CD	—	—	—	—	
Classic	Released: 29 May 2000; Label: Universal; Formats: CD	—	—	—	—	
The Collection	Released: 5 February 2001; Label: Spectrum Music; Formats: CD	—	—	—	—	UK: Silver
Greatest Hits and More	Released: March 2001; Label: Polydor; Formats: 2xCD	—	—	—	—	
Steppin' Out: The Very Best of Joe Jackson	Released: 22 May 2001; Label: A&M; Formats: 2xCD	—	—	—	—	
20th Century Masters – The Millennium Collection: The Best of Joe Jackson	Released: 25 September 2001; Label: A&M; Formats: CD	—	—	—	—	
The Ultimate Collection	Released: 29 September 2003; Label: Universal; Formats: 3xCD	—	—	—	—	
Very Best of Joe Jackson	Released: 28 May 2007; Label: Universal Music TV; Formats: CD	60	—	—	—	
The Silver Collection	Released: 4 June 2007; Label: Spectrum Music/Universal; Formats: CD	—	—	—	—	
Tonight & Forever – The Joe Jackson Collection	Released: 23 July 2007; Label: Spectrum Music/Universal; Formats: 2xCD	—	—	—	—	
At the BBC	Released: 26 January 2009; Label: Spectrum Music; Formats: 2xCD	—	—	—	—	
Collected	Released: 5 October 2010; Label: Universal; Formats: 3xCD	—	—	—	48	
Steppin' Out – The Collection	Released: 29 September 2014; Label: Spectrum Music/Universal; Formats: 3xCD	—	—	—	—	
"—" denotes releases that did not chart or were not released in that territory.

=== Box sets ===
Title	Album details
The Joe Jackson Collection	Released: 1988; Label: A&M; Formats: 6xLP
3 Original CDs	Released: 1995; Label: A&M; Formats: 3xCD
The A&M Years 1979–1989	Released: July 2007; Label: A&M; Formats: 9xCD

=== Video albums ===
Title	Album details
The Big World Sessions	Released: September 1986; Label: Pioneer Artists/A&M Video; Formats: VHS, LD
Live in Tokyo	Released: April 1988; Label: A&M Video; Formats: VHS, LD
Stepping Out: The Videos	Released: September 1990; Label: A&M Video/Channel 5; Formats: VHS
Laughter & Lust Live	Released: May 1992; Label: Warner Music Vision, Pioneer Artists; Formats: VHS, LD
25th Anniversary Special	Released: 18 March 2003; Label: STS Media, Image Entertainment; Formats: DVD, VHS
20th Century Masters – The DVD Collection: The Best of Joe Jackson	Released: August 2005; Label: A&M; Formats: DVD
Live at Rockpalast	Released: 30 March 2012; Label: MIG; Formats: 2xDVD

== Singles ==
Title	Year	Peak chart positions										Album
Title	Year	UK	AUS	CAN	GER	IRE	NL	NZ	US	US AC	US Main	Album
"Is She Really Going Out with Him?"	1978	—	—	—	—	—	—	—	—	—	—	Look Sharp!
"Sunday Papers"	1979	— (Note: This single did not enter the UK Singles Chart, but did reach number 100 on the Record Business Singles Chart.)	—	—	—	—	—	—	—	—	—	Look Sharp!
"One More Time"	1979	— (Note: This single did not enter the UK Singles Chart, but did reach number 90 on the Record Business Singles Chart.)	—	—	—	—	—	—	—	—	—	Look Sharp!
"Fools in Love" (Note: Only released as a single in the Netherlands.)	1979	—	—	—	—	—	—	—	—	—	—	Look Sharp!
"Is She Really Going Out with Him?" (reissue)	1979	13	15	9	—	8	46	18	21	—	—	Look Sharp!
"I'm the Man"	1979	— (Note: This single did not enter the UK Singles Chart, but did reach number 84 on the Record Business Singles Chart.)	—	23	—	—	—	—	—	—	—	I'm the Man
"It's Different for Girls"	1979	5	85	—	—	4	—	—	101	—	—	I'm the Man
"Kinda Kute"	1980	— (Note: This single did not enter the UK Singles Chart, but did reach number 60 on the Record Business Singles Chart.)	—	91	—	—	—	—	—	—	—	I'm the Man
"The Harder They Come"	1980	— (Note: This single did not enter the UK Singles Chart, but did reach number 67 on the Record Business Singles Chart.)	—	—	—	—	34	—	—	—	—	Non-album single
"Mad at You"	1980	— (Note: This single did not enter the UK Singles Chart, but did reach number 85 on the Record Business Singles Chart.)	—	—	—	—	—	—	—	—	—	Beat Crazy
"Pretty Boys"	1980	—	—	—	—	—	—	—	—	—	—	Beat Crazy
"One to One"	1980	— (Note: This single did not enter the UK Singles Chart, but did reach number 123 on the Record Business Singles Chart.)	—	—	—	—	—	—	—	—	—	Beat Crazy
"Beat Crazy"	1981	— (Note: This single did not enter the UK Singles Chart, but did reach number 100 on the Record Business Singles Chart.)	—	—	—	—	—	—	—	—	—	Beat Crazy
"Jumpin' Jive"	1981	43	61	—	—	—	—	32	—	—	—	Joe Jackson's Jumpin' Jive
"Jack, You're Dead"	1981	— (Note: This single did not enter the UK Singles Chart, but did reach number 82 on the Record Business Singles Chart.)	—	—	—	—	—	—	—	—	—	Joe Jackson's Jumpin' Jive
"Real Men"	1982	89	6	—	—	—	17	48	—	—	—	Night and Day
"Steppin' Out"	1982	6	30	5	28	5	—	21	6	4	7	Night and Day
"Breaking Us in Two"	1982	59	90	40	—	26	—	35	18	8	—	Night and Day
"Another World" (Note: Only released as a single in the US and Australia.)	1983	—	—	—	—	—	—	—	—	—	—	Night and Day
"A Slow Song"	1983	195	—	—	—	—	—	—	—	—	—	Night and Day
"Cosmopolitan"	1983	—	—	—	—	—	—	—	—	—	—	Mike's Murder (soundtrack)
"Memphis" (Note: "Memphis" was only released as a single in North America, Australasia and Continental Europe.)	1983	—	—	—	—	—	—	—	85	—	—	Mike's Murder (soundtrack)
"Moonlight"	1983	—	—	—	—	—	—	—	—	—	—	Mike's Murder (soundtrack)
"You Can't Get What You Want (Till You Know What You Want)"	1984	77	96	30	—	—	—	—	15	13	12	Body and Soul
"Happy Ending" (with Elaine Caswell)	1984	58	47	—	—	—	19	—	57	—	—	Body and Soul
"Be My Number Two"	1984	70	—	—	—	—	—	—	—	—	—	Body and Soul
"Cha Cha Loco" (Note: Only released as a single in Continental Europe.)	1984	—	—	—	—	—	—	—	—	—	—	Body and Soul
"The Verdict" (Note: "The Verdict" was only released as a single in Japan.)	1985	—	—	—	—	—	—	—	—	—	—	Body and Soul
"Right and Wrong"	1986	90	64	—	—	—	—	—	—	—	11	Big World
"Left of Center" (Suzanne Vega featuring Joe Jackson)	1986	32	35	—	—	28	—	—	—	—	—	Pretty in Pink (soundtrack)
"Home Town"	1986	185	—	—	—	—	—	—	—	—	—	Big World
"The Jet Set" (Note: Only released as a single in Australia and Germany.)	1986	—	—	—	—	—	—	—	—	—	—	Big World
"Tango Atlantico" (Note: "Tango Atlantico" was only released as a single in Germany.)	1986	—	—	—	—	—	—	—	—	—	—	Big World
"Nocturne"	1987	—	—	—	—	—	—	—	—	—	—	Will Power
"Jumpin' Jive" (live)	1988	—	—	—	—	—	—	—	—	—	—	Live 1980/86
"Look Sharp!" (live) (Note: "Look Sharp!" Was only released as a single in the US and South Africa.)	1988	—	—	—	—	—	—	—	—	—	—	Live 1980/86
"Is She Really Going Out with Him?" (live)	1988	—	—	—	—	—	5	—	—	—	—	Live 1980/86
"(He's a) Shape in a Drape"	1988	—	95	73	—	—	35	—	—	—	—	Tucker (soundtrack)
"Nineteen Forever"	1989	—	80	59	—	—	44	—	—	—	16	Blaze of Glory
"Down to London"	1989	—	126	—	—	—	—	—	—	—	—	Blaze of Glory
"Blaze of Glory"	1989	—	—	—	—	—	—	—	—	—	—	Blaze of Glory
"Steppin' Out" (reissue)	1990	97	—	—	—	—	—	—	—	—	—	Stepping Out: The Very Best of Joe Jackson
"Stranger Than Fiction"	1991	112	119	79	53	—	71	—	—	—	—	Laughter & Lust
"Hit Single"	1991	—	129	—	—	—	—	—	—	—	—	Laughter & Lust
"Oh Well" (Note: "Oh Well" was released as a single in Europe and as a promotional single in the US.)	1991	—	—	—	—	—	—	—	—	—	25	Laughter & Lust
"Stranger Than You"	2000	—	—	—	—	—	91	—	—	—	—	Night and Day II
"Glamour and Pain" (Joe Jackson presents Dale De Vere)	2002	—	—	—	—	—	—	—	—	—	—	Night and Day II
"Chrome"	2003	—	—	—	—	—	—	—	—	—	—	Volume 4
"Awkward Age"	2003	—	—	—	—	—	—	—	—	—	—	Volume 4
"In 20-0-3"	2004	—	—	—	—	—	—	—	—	—	—	Non-album single
"King Pleasure Time" (The Remixes)	2008	—	—	—	—	—	—	—	—	—	—	Rain
"A Little Smile"	2015	—	—	—	—	—	—	—	—	—	—	Fast Forward
"Fast Forward"	2015	—	—	—	—	—	—	—	—	—	—	Fast Forward
"Friend Better"	2019	—	—	—	—	—	—	—	—	—	—	Fool
"Peter Gunn"	2019	—	—	—	—	—	—	—	—	—	—	Fool
"Night by Night"	2019	—	—	—	—	—	—	—	—	—	—	Fool
"Health & Safety"	2023	—	—	—	—	—	—	—	—	—	—	What a Racket!
"What a Racket!"	2023	—	—	—	—	—	—	—	—	—	—	What a Racket!
"Welcome to Burning-by-Sea"	2025	—	—	—	—	—	—	—	—	—	—	Hope and Fury
"Fabulous People"	2026	—	—	—	—	—	—	—	—	—	—	Hope and Fury
"After All This Time"	2026	—	—	—	—	—	—	—	—	—	—	Hope and Fury
"—" denotes releases that did not chart or were not released in that territory.

=== Other singles ===
Title	Year	Peak chart positions			Album
Title	Year	CAN	US Alt	US Main	Album
"Pretty Girls" (Note: "Pretty Girls" was scheduled for release as a single and was produced on acetate. However, it was cancelled in favour of "Sunday Papers".)	1979	—	—	—	Look Sharp!
"Wild West" (Note: "Wild West" was released as the title track of a promotional EP in the US.)	1986	—	—	—	Big World
"I'm the Man" (live) (Note: Released as a promotional single in the US.)	1988	—	—	—	Live 1980/86
"Me and You (Against the World)"	1989	—	—	—	Blaze of Glory
"Obvious Song" (Note: "Obvious Song" was only released as a promotional single in the US. It also charted in Canada due to airplay.)	1991	64	2	28	Laughter & Lust
"Ever After" (Note: "Ever After" was released as a promotional single in the Netherlands and Spain.)	1994	—	—	—	Night Music
"Angel (Lust)" (featuring Suzanne Vega and Dawn Upshaw) (Note: "Angel (Lust)" was released as a promotional single in Europe, Australia and the US.)	1997	—	—	—	Heaven & Hell
"Passacaglia – A Bud and a Slice (Sloth)" (featuring Brad Roberts) (Note: "Passacaglia – A Bud and a Slice (Sloth)" was released as a promotional single in Europe and the US.)	1997	—	—	—	Heaven & Hell
"Statue of Liberty" (Note: "Statue of Liberty" was released as a promotional single in Australasia.)	1997	—	—	—	A Testimonial Dinner: The Songs of XTC
"Take It Like a Man"	2003	—	—	—	Volume 4
"Rush Across the Road" (Note: Only released as a promotional single.)	2008	—	—	—	Rain
"Invisible Man"	2008	—	—	—	Rain
"Too Tough"	2008	—	—	—	Rain
"If It Wasn't for You"	2015	—	—	—	Fast Forward
"—" denotes releases that did not chart or were not released in that territory.
