= At the BBC (Joe Jackson album) =

Compilation album by Joe Jackson
- Released: 26 January 2009
- Length: 147:51
- Label: Spectrum Music

Joe Jackson chronology
Rain (2008)	At the BBC (2009)	Collected (2010)

At the BBC is a compilation album by English musician and singer-songwriter Joe Jackson, released by Spectrum Music on 26 January 2009.

== Content ==
At the BBC contains 32 tracks across two discs, all of which were performed for the BBC by Jackson and his band between 1979 and 1983. The first four tracks of disc one were recorded at Maida Vale Studios on 21 February 1979 and broadcast on John Peel's BBC Radio 1 show on 26 February 1979. The remaining eleven tracks on the disc were recorded at London's Hammersmith Odeon on 15 August 1982 and broadcast on Radio 1 on 2 October 1982 as part of their "In Concert" series. Disc two's first ten tracks were recorded at the Hatfield Polytechnic on 29 November 1979 and broadcast on BBC TV series Rock Goes to College on 14 January 1980. The remaining seven tracks were recorded at the Regal Theatre in Hitchin on 22 January 1983 and broadcast on the same date on BBC TV and Radio 1's Sight & Sound in Concert.

== Critical reception ==
Professional ratings
Review scores
Source	Rating
AllMusic	4.5/5 stars
Record Collector	4/5 stars

Stephen Thomas Erlewine of AllMusic praised the album for its "vigorous, exciting music" and "unbridled, palpable energy". He felt the material provided "proof of the Joe Jackson Band's greatness as a live act" and described the compilation as "one of the better punk/new wave live sets available". Joe Shooman of Record Collector described it as a "superb set". Speaking of the 1983 Sight & Sound in Concert material, he commented that the band were "fantastic, tight, tuneful, energetic and cheeky".

== Track listing ==
=== Disc one ===
All tracks are written by Joe Jackson except where noted.

No.	Title	Writer(s)	Length
1.	"One More Time"		3:05
2.	"Got the Time"		2:57
3.	"Fools in Love"		4:41
4.	"I'm the Man"		4:05
5.	"Look Sharp!"		4:12
6.	"Cancer"		7:06
7.	"Real Men"		4:25
8.	"Breaking Us in Two"		5:13
9.	"Fools in Love"		7:55
10.	"Chinatown"		4:55
11.	"Target"		1:45
12.	"T.V. Age"	Jackson, Steve Tatler	5:04
13.	"It's Different for Girls"		4:16
14.	"Tuxedo Junction"	Julian Dash, Buddy Feyne, Erskine Hawkins, William Johnson	5:53
15.	"Steppin' Out"		4:45

=== Disc two ===
All tracks are written by Joe Jackson except "Come On" by Chuck Berry.

No.	Title	Length
1.	"Sunday Papers"	5:22
2.	"One More Time"	2:51
3.	"Friday"	3:50
4.	"It's Different for Girls"	3:41
5.	"Don't Wanna Be Like That"	3:37
6.	"Happy Loving Couples"	4:25
7.	"I'm the Man"	4:28
8.	"Got the Time"	3:22
9.	"Is She Really Going Out with Him?"	5:11
10.	"Come On"	3:29
11.	"On Your Radio"	5:06
12.	"Another World"	4:52
13.	"Sunday Papers"	5:27
14.	"Look Sharp!"	4:28
15.	"Is She Really Going Out with Him?"	4:20
16.	"Steppin' Out"	4:52
17.	"A Slow Song"	8:30

== Personnel ==
Production

- John Sparrow – producer (John Peel 1979 tracks)
- Mike Robinson – engineer (John Peel 1979 tracks)

Other

- Sue Armstrong – project management
- Moodboard/Corbis – cover photo
- Stills Press Agency/Rex Features – inside photo of Jackson
- Terry Staunton – liner notes
