= Steppin' Out – The Collection =

Compilation album by Joe Jackson
- Released: 29 September 2014
- Recorded: 1979–1989
- Genre: New wave, rock, pop
- Label: A&M Records

Joe Jackson chronology
The Duke (2012)	Steppin' Out – The Collection (2014)	Fast Forward (2015)

Steppin' Out – The Collection, released on 29 September 2014, is a Joe Jackson compilation album, covering his period with A&M Records between the years 1979 and 1989. This album has different and fewer numbers than the earlier compilation album This Is It! (The A&M Years 1979–1989) from February 1997, covering the same period with A&M.

== Track listing ==
All songs written and arranged by Joe Jackson, except where noted.

Disc One
No.	Title	Album	Length
1.	"One More Time"	Look Sharp! (1979)	3:15
2.	"Is She Really Going Out with Him?"	Look Sharp!	3:33
3.	"Sunday Papers"	Look Sharp!	4:22
4.	"Got the Time"	Look Sharp!	2:55
5.	"It's Different for Girls"	I'm the Man (1979)	3:42
6.	"I'm the Man"	I'm the Man	3:58
7.	"Beat Crazy"	Beat Crazy (1980)	4:15
8.	"Mad at You"	Beat Crazy	6:02
9.	"Jumpin' Jive (1981)" (written by Cab Calloway, Frank Froeba and Jack Palmer)	Jumpin' Jive (1981)	2:41
10.	"Real Men"	Night and Day (1982)	4:04
11.	"Steppin' Out"	Night and Day	4:23
12.	"Breaking Us in Two"	Night and Day	4:53
13.	"Memphis"	Mike's Murder (1983)	4:44
14.	"You Can't Get What You Want (Till You Know What You Want)"	Body & Soul (1984)	4:50
15.	"Be My Number Two"	Body & Soul	4:18
16.	"Right and Wrong"	Big World (1986)	4:35
17.	"Home Town"	Big World	3:12
18.	"Down to London"	Blaze of Glory (1989)	4:14
19.	"Nineteen Forever"	Blaze of Glory	5:48
