= Live at Rockpalast (Joe Jackson album) =

Live album by Joe Jackson Band
- Released: 30 March 2012
- Recorded: March 1980 – April 1983
- Genre: Rock, pop
- Length: 2:31:52
- Label: MIG Music
- Producer: Joe Jackson

Joe Jackson Band chronology
Live Music - Europe 2010 (2011)	Live at Rockpalast (2012)	The Duke (2012)

Live at Rockpalast is a compilation live album by Joe Jackson.

== Track listing ==
The box set contains three complete Rockpalast shows on two DVDs and two CDs.

Grugahalle, Essen, Germany (recorded on 16 and 17 April 1983)
No.	Title	Length
1.	"On Your Radio"	4:59
2.	"Another World"	5:11
3.	"Sunday Papers"	5:33
4.	"Look Sharp!"	4:23
5.	"Breaking Us in Two"	5:12
6.	"Is She Really Going Out with Him?"	4:20
7.	"Target"	2:43
8.	"TV Age"	5:09
9.	"Tuxedo Junction"	5:57
10.	"Steppin' Out"	4:45
11.	"Beat Crazy"	4:10
12.	"One More Time"	3:08
13.	"A Slow Song"	8:37
14.	"Uptight"	1:36
15.	"The Tears of a Clown"	1:54
16.	"I'm Gonna Make You Love Me"	2:58
17.	"How Sweet It Is to Be Loved"	2:25
18.	"Heatwave"	3:07
19.	"Uptight (Reprise)"	1:31
20.	"I'm the Man"	5:21

WDR Studio, Cologne, Germany (recorded on 14 March 1980)
No.	Title	Length
1.	"On Your Radio"	4:22
2.	"Friday"	4:49
3.	"Mad at You"	4:11
4.	"Kinda Kute"	3:25
5.	"Out of Style"	3:04
6.	"The Harder They Come"	4:05
7.	"Sunday Papers"	5:45
8.	"One More Time"	4:03
9.	"Fools in Love"	4:38
10.	"Is She Really Going Out with Him"	6:14
11.	"Don't Wanna Be Like That"	3:54
12.	"I'm the Man"	5:08

Markthalle, Hamburg, Germany (recorded on 21 February 1983)
No.	Title	Length
1.	"On Your Radio"	5:00
2.	"Another World"	5:04
3.	"Sunday Papers"	5:30
4.	"Look Sharp!"	5:19
5.	"Breaking Us in Two"	5:56
6.	"Cancer"	8:07
7.	"Real Men"	6:00
8.	"Is She Really Going Out with Him"	5:28
9.	"Cosmopolitan"	5:38
10.	"Target"	2:16
11.	"TV Age"	6:01
12.	"Tuxedo Junction"	5:56
13.	"Steppin' Out"	4:38
14.	"Beat Crazy"	4:17
15.	"One More Time"	4:02
16.	"A Slow Song"	8:20
17.	"Motown Medley: Uptight / Tears Of A Clown / I'm Gonna Make You Love Me / How Sweet It Is To Be Loved / Heatwave / Uptight"	14:58
18.	"I'm the Man"	4:57

== Personnel ==
- Joe Jackson – piano, vocals
- Graham Maby – bass, vocals
- Gary Sanford – guitar, vocals
- Dave Houghton – drums
- Sue Hadjopoulos – congas, bongos, xylophone
- Joy Askew – keyboards, vocals
- Ed Rynesdal – keyboards
