= Greatest Hits (Joe Jackson album) =

Greatest hits album by Joe Jackson
- Released: 7 May 1996
- Genre: New wave, rock, pop
- Length: 1:16:13
- Label: A&M Records

Joe Jackson chronology
Night Music (1994)	Greatest Hits (1996)	This Is It! (The A&M Years 1979-1989) (1997)

Greatest Hits is a 1996 compilation album from the British musician Joe Jackson. The album is part of the Backlot series from A&M Records featuring newly designed artwork, digital remastering and extensive liner notes. Tracks include the hits "Is She Really Going Out with Him?", "It's Different for Girls", "Steppin' Out" and "You Can't Get What You Want (Till You Know What You Want)", plus live versions of "A Slow Song" and "Memphis".

== Track listing ==
No.	Title	Album	Length
1.	"Is She Really Going Out with Him?"	Look Sharp! (1979)	3:33
2.	"Look Sharp!"	Look Sharp!	3:23
3.	"Sunday Papers"	Look Sharp!	4:22
4.	"I'm the Man"	I'm the Man (1979)	3:58
5.	"It's Different for Girls"	I'm the Man	3:42
6.	"Beat Crazy"	Beat Crazy (1980)	4:15
7.	"Jumpin' Jive"	Jumpin' Jive (1981)	2:41
8.	"Breaking Us in Two"	Night and Day (1982)	4:53
9.	"Steppin' Out"	Night and Day	4:23
10.	"A Slow Song" (live album version)	Live 1980/86 (1988)	7:45
11.	"Memphis"	Live 1980/86	5:19
12.	"You Can't Get What You Want (Till You Know What You Want)"	Body & Soul (1984)	4:50
13.	"Be My Number Two"	Body & Soul	4:18
14.	"Right and Wrong"	Big World (1986)	4:35
15.	"Home Town"	Big World	3:12
16.	"Down to London"	Blaze of Glory (1989)	4:14
17.	"Nineteen Forever"	Blaze of Glory	5:48
