= Afterlife (Joe Jackson album) =

Live album by Joe Jackson Band
- Released: 15 March 2004
- Recorded: 27–31 August 2003
- Genre: Rock, pop
- Length: 58:02
- Label: Rykodisk
- Producer: Joe Jackson

Joe Jackson Band chronology
Volume 4 (2003)	Afterlife (2004)	Rain (2008)

Professional ratings
Review scores
Source	Rating
AllMusic	3.5/5 stars

Afterlife is a 2004 live album by Joe Jackson. It contains recordings from performances on 27 August 2003 at The Fillmore in San Francisco, CA, at House of Blues on 28 August in Los Angeles CA and on 29 August in Anaheim CA, and ultimately, on 31 August 2003 in San Diego CA at 4th and B.

For these recording Jackson re-united with the musicians from his first successes: Graham Maby, Gary Sanford and Dave Houghton. As he made television appearances to promote the album, Jackson insisted that the quartet's reunion had been a one-off.

His recording of "Steppin' Out" was used in a television advertisement for Lincoln-Mercury automobiles.

== Track listing ==
All songs written and arranged by Joe Jackson, except where noted.

No.	Title	Writer(s)	Length
1.	"Steppin' Out"		4:25
2.	"One More Time"		3:05
3.	"Take It Like a Man"		4:05
4.	"Awkward Age"		3:19
5.	"Look Sharp!"		3:39
6.	"Down to London"		5:08
7.	"Beat Crazy"		4:21
8.	"Fools in Love/For Your Love"	"For Your Love" by Graham Gouldman	7:18
9.	"Love at First Light"		4:58
10.	"Fairy Dust"		4:05
11.	"Sunday Papers"		4:44
12.	"Don't Wanna Be Like That"		4:34
13.	"Got the Time"		4:21

== Personnel ==
Musicians

- Joe Jackson – keyboards, melodica, vocals
- Graham Maby – bass, vocals
- David Houghton – drums, vocals
- Gary Sanford – guitar, vocals

Production

- Joe Jackson - arrangements, producer
- Julie Gardner - recording engineer, mixing engineer
- Ray Staff - mastering engineer
- Paul Smith - mixing engineer
- Frank Orlinsky - art direction
- Tom Sheehan - photography
