= Two Rainy Nights =

Live album by Joe Jackson
- Released: January 2002
- Genre: Rock, pop
- Label: Koch Records

Joe Jackson chronology
Night and Day II (2000)	Two Rainy Nights (2002)	Volume 4 (2003)

Professional ratings
Review scores
Source	Rating
AllMusic	3/5 stars

Two Rainy Nights is a 2002 live album by Joe Jackson. Initially available on his own Great Big Island label only from Jackson's website, it was subsequently released on CD. The album is a combination of newer songs and older material, recorded at performances in Seattle WA and Portland OR in April 2001.

== Track listing ==
All songs written and arranged by Joe Jackson.

No.	Title	Length
1.	"Prelude/Hell of a Town"	7:10
2.	"You Can't Get What You Want 'Till You Know What You Want"	3:13
3.	"Happyland"	4:32
4.	"Stranger Than You"	4:21
5.	"Another World"	4:18
6.	"Is She Really Going Out with Him?"	4:18
7.	"Home Town"	5:30
8.	"Real Men"	4:42
9.	"Stranger than Fiction"	4:09
10.	"Glamour & Pain"	5:36
11.	"Target"	4:05
12.	"Just Because"	4:07
13.	"Got the Time"	3:21
14.	"A Slow Song"	7:36

== Personnel ==
Musicians

- Joe Jackson – piano, keyboards, melodica, vocals
- Catherine Bent - percussion, cello
- Allison Cornell - violin, keyboards, vocals
- Andy Ezrin - keyboards
- Sue Hadjopoulos - percussion
- Graham Maby - bass, vocals
- Roberto Juan Rodriguez - drums

Production

- Joe Jackson - arrangements, producer
- Sheldon Steiger - recording engineer, mixing
