= On Your Radio =

1979 song by Joe Jackson

Song by Joe Jackson

from the album I'm the Man
- Released: 5 October 1979
- Recorded: March 1979, TW Studios, Fulham, London
- Genre: New wave; punk rock
- Label: A&M
- Songwriter(s): Joe Jackson
- Producer(s): David Kershenbaum

"On Your Radio" is a song written and performed by new wave musician Joe Jackson for his 1979 album I'm the Man. Written by Jackson as a put-down of his past enemies, the song features a prominent bass line played by Graham Maby.

Though not released as a single, "On Your Radio" has since become a live favorite of Jackson's and has seen positive critical reception.

== Lyrics and music ==
According to AllMusic's Tom Maginnis, "On Your Radio" was written by Jackson as an "honest yet cutting kiss-off to all those who ever doubted him". The song condemns Jackson's enemies of the past in lyrics such as "Ex-friends, ex-lovers, and enemies/I've got your cases in front of me today/All sewn up/Ex-bosses you never let me be/I got your names and your numbers filed away/I've grown up." Jackson had been an unpopular outcast during his youth; in an interview, Jackson recalled struggles with asthma and remembered being "punched, tripped and taunted in the playground".

Musically, the song is consistent with the new wave style of Jackson's music at the time; according to Maginnis, the song "cruises along upon the exuberant bounce of a straight driving bassline" played by Joe Jackson Band bassist Graham Maby. Maginnis also notes the "steady rhythmic jangle" that comes from guitarist Gary Sanford's performance.

== Reception ==
Maginnis writes, "If nothing else, 'On Your Radio' signaled to fans that if you liked Look Sharp!, you were going to find some tunes that you like just as well on this one". Trouser Press named the song as one of the tracks on I'm the Man that "up[s] the bile quotient" from Look Sharp! Peter Larsen of the Orange County Register described the song as "one of the fast and furious early songs". Glide Magazine ranked the song as Jackson's best song, while Dave Marsh and James Bernard ranked the song as the 14th best song about radio.

Jackson collaborator Suzanne Vega named the song one of her five essential Joe Jackson songs, stating, "The ultimate revenge song of fame. Who hasn't been there and had those fantasies of rising above all the people who oppress you? "You can't get near me, you can only hope to hear me on your radio." What every songwriter hopes for."

== Live history ==
"On Your Radio" has been played live by Jackson since its release, often as the opening song on his setlist. Several live performances of the song have appeared on releases of Jackson's concerts at Rockpalast from 1980 to 1983.
