= Live Music - Europe 2010 =

Live Music – Europe 2010

Live album by Joe Jackson Band
- Released: 3 June 2011
- Recorded: October–November 2010
- Genre: Rock, pop
- Length: 59:03
- Label: Razor & Tie
- Producer: Joe Jackson

Joe Jackson Band chronology
Live in Germany 1980 (2011)	Live Music – Europe 2010 (2011)	Live at Rockpalast (2012)

Live Music – Europe 2010 is a live album by Joe Jackson.

Recordings for this album were made at the following locations:

- La Luciole in Alençon, France on 22 October 2010
- La Carenne in Brest, France on 23 October 2010
- Avo Sessions in Basel, Switzerland on 31 October 2010
- Paradiso music venue in Amsterdam, Netherlands on 7 November 2010
- Gloria Theatre in Cologne, Germany on 8 November 2010
- Postbahnhof in Berlin, Germany on 11 November 2010

== Track listing ==
All songs written and arranged by Joe Jackson, except where noted.

No.	Title	Writer(s)	Recording	Length
1.	"Tomorrow's World"		Brest	5:36
2.	"Another World"			4:23
3.	"Still Alive"			4:17
4.	"Chinatown"		Basel	5:40
5.	"Sunday Papers"		Basel	4:36
6.	"Cancer"		Cologne	5:35
7.	"Girl"	John Lennon, Paul McCartney	Cologne	5:18
8.	"Inbetweenies"	Ian Dury, Chaz Jankel	Berlin	5:13
9.	"Scary Monsters"	David Bowie	Brest	3:22
10.	"Got the Time"		Amsterdam	3:27
11.	"Steppin' Out"		Alençon	4:50
12.	"A Slow Song"		Basel	6:41

"Fools in Love" was available as a free download bonus track via the official Joe Jackson website.

== Personnel ==
Musicians

- Joe Jackson – piano, synthesizer, melodica, shaker, vocals
- Graham Maby – bass, vocals
- Dave Houghton – electric and acoustic drums, loops, vocals

Production

- Joe Jackson – arrangements, producer
- George Cowan – recording engineer
- Blackpete – mixing engineer
- Tilmann Ilse, Martin Schattenberg – digital editing
- Greg Calbi – mastering engineer
- Ed Sherman – art direction
- Anabel Ganske – photography
