= Look Sharp! =

Look Sharp! may refer to:

- Look Sharp! (Joe Jackson album), and the title song
- Look Sharp! (Roxette album)
