= Awkward Age =

2003 song by the Joe Jackson Band

Single by Joe Jackson Band

from the album Volume 4
- B-side: "Still Alive"
- Released: 17 February 2003 (US)
- Length: 3:20
- Label: Rykodisc
- Songwriter: Joe Jackson
- Producer: Joe Jackson

Joe Jackson Band singles chronology
"Chrome" (2003)	"Awkward Age" (2003)	"In 20-0-3" (2004)

"Awkward Age" is a song by the Joe Jackson Band, released in 2003 as the second and final single from Jackson's sixteenth studio album, Volume 4 (2003). The song was written and produced by Jackson.

== Background ==
In a 2002 interview with Kurt Orzeck, Jackson said the following about the song's message, "I saw a 15-year-old girl in a railway station and tried to imagine if I was talking to her what I would say. The song starts off saying you're having all kinds of problems because you are at an awkward age, but then it says well wait, I'm still having problems, [so] maybe we're all under the pressure from the media and marketing to be cool and thin and flawless. Though I wouldn't want to be 15 again, we're all having the same struggles."

== Release ==
In the US, "Awkward Age" was released to radio on 17 February 2003, with targeted formats including triple-A, hot AC, AC, modern rock and NPR.

== Critical reception ==
Jim Farber of the Daily News described "Awkward Age" as a "kind of musical corollary to the film Ghost World" and the "greatest triumph" on Volume 4. He wrote, "The grownup Jackson finds himself relating to a teen, discovering they're both going through awkward ages. And he recognizes that the awkwardness lasts for as long as we live. The band treats the lyrics to a thrillingly teenage beat, kicked to the hilt by Houghton." In a review of Volume 4, PopMatters noted the song "might seem the most likely candidate for radio single" and added that it is "an infectious upbeat bit of advice to an awkward youth that turns into a confession that age hasn't clarified matters any for the narrator and then expands into a call to remain individualistic against the age's onslaught of advertising and media demands".

In a 2019 retrospective titled "A Joe Jackson playlist, beyond the hits", Tom Casciato of PBS NewsHour, included "Awkward Age", calling it "an almost impossibly catchy tune" that features Jackson "slyly mining the gawkiness of an uncomfortable youth only to reveal that for him – and probably for the listener, too – every age has a way of turning out to be awkward".

== Track listing ==
CD single (Europe)

1. "Awkward Age" – 3:20
2. "Still Alive" – 3:42

CD promotional single (US)

1. "Awkward Age" – 3:20

== Personnel ==
Joe Jackson Band

- Joe Jackson – vocals, keyboards
- Gary Sanford – guitar
- Graham Maby – bass, backing vocals
- Dave Houghton – drums, backing vocals

Production

- Joe Jackson – producer
- Julie Gardner – recording
- Helen Atkinson – recording assistant
- Sean Slade – mixing
- Paul Kolderie – mixing
- Juan Garcia – mixing assistant
- Ted Jensen – mastering

Other

- Spencer Rowell – photography
- Matt Dornan – layout

== Charts ==
Chart (2003)	Peak position
US Triple A Top 30 Indicator (Radio & Records)	10
