= Is She Really Going Out with Him? =

Single by Joe Jackson

from the album Look Sharp!
- B-side: "You Got the Fever" (UK); "(Do the) Instant Mash" (US)
- Released: October 1978
- Recorded: August 1978
- Studio: Eden (London)
- Genre: New wave; pop
- Length: 3:35
- Label: A&M
- Songwriter: Joe Jackson
- Producer: David Kershenbaum

Joe Jackson singles chronology
"Is She Really Going Out with Him?" (1978)	"Sunday Papers" (1979)

"Is She Really Going Out with Him?" is a song written and performed by British musician Joe Jackson. It was released in October 1978 as his debut single and was later included on Jackson's 1979 debut album, Look Sharp! The track was one of the first Jackson recorded with his new backing band, a band he would perform with for his first three albums. Written as a humorous commentary on women dating unattractive men, the song contains a prominent bass line and a chorus praised by critics as memorable. Jackson has since stated that the song's reputation for being angry was untrue.

On its initial release, the single was commercially unsuccessful and failed to chart. Two follow-up singles, "Sunday Papers" and "One More Time", were also chart failures. However, when "Is She Really Going Out with Him?" was rereleased in mid-1979 after Jackson's reputation and new wave music grew in popularity, the single saw more attention and became a chart success. This second release reached the top 20 in the UK and top 30 in the US, becoming one of Jackson's highest-charting singles worldwide. It spent fifteen weeks on the US Billboard Hot 100 and was Jackson's fourth-highest and first song on that chart when it peaked at number 21 the weeks of August 18 and 25, 1979. In Canada it reached number 9 and was on the charts for 23 weeks.

Since then, the song has been praised as one of Jackson's greatest and most famous and has been covered by multiple artists. The song has appeared on several of Jackson's compilation albums and remains a staple of Jackson's live setlist. A live a cappella version released in 1988 was a top five single in the Netherlands. It has been described as one of the classics of the new wave genre, though Jackson does not consider it his best song.

== Background ==
"Is She Really Going Out with Him?" was one of the first songs Joe Jackson recorded with the Joe Jackson Band, which included bassist Graham Maby, guitarist Gary Sanford, and drummer Dave Houghton. The song was immediately popular with the band; Jackson recalled in his autobiography, "Everyone liked it. It was catchy, they said, and had the makings of a hit. I wouldn't know a hit, I protested, from a hole in my head. I liked all my songs, and if I'd written a hit it was by accident. But I appreciated the enthusiasm, and something else, too: a growing feeling that I was up to something". The final version of the song was recorded with American producer David Kershenbaum in August 1978 after Jackson was signed to A&M Records.

According to Jackson, the song originated from when he heard the title. Jackson claimed that he had first heard it on a song by the Damned, who had gotten it from the Shangri-Las' song, "Leader of the Pack". From there, he came up with the basis for lyrics for "a funny little song about watching couples and wondering what the girls could possibly see in the guys". Jackson recalled, "It wasn't based on a specific incident or anything like that ... I tried to write a funny song around that title, and that’s about all there was to it, really". Though the song was written to be comical, it has been interpreted by some critics as angry, earning Jackson the tag of "angry young man". He said of the song's origins in an interview:

I heard that phrase somewhere and I thought that could be a kind of funny song about gorgeous girls going out with monsters. It just started from there. It was just a funny song, or supposed to be funny. It was a great surprise to me when some people interpreted it as being angry.

— Joe Jackson, Songfacts, 2012

In another interview, Jackson recalled another incident where the lyrics to the song were misinterpreted. He explained that he was accused of racism by a black man because of the song's opening lyric "Pretty women out walking with gorillas down my street", which the man had thought was about black men dating white women. Jackson concluded, "And no matter what I said he wouldn't believe me, and as far as he was concerned that was what it was. So, I mean, really, what can you do? (Laughs) I always feel like my lyrics are very clear, but what can I say?"

== Music and lyrics ==
"Is She Really Going Out with Him?" has been described by critics as "snotty piano pop" and "the sound of New Wave boiled down into three minutes and 35 seconds." The song contains a "soft seesaw rhythm of plunking guitar and bass"; the bass line, played by Jackson's longtime collaborator Graham Maby, has seen praise from critics. Steve Huey of AllMusic praises the rhythm section's performance for "immediately setting a vibe of cool indignation". The song's chorus, which has been described as "perfectly singable" and "strong and emotionally compelling", contains "clean guitars and tight bass and drum groove" accompanied by Jackson's "lush vocals". The song's bridge is more piano-based, showing what Huey describes as "a glimpse of Jackson jazz training".

Lyrically, the song contains a "string of priceless quips" about "boy/girl laws of attraction"; the opening lyric, "Pretty women out walking with gorillas down my street", has been highlighted by Huey. Huey also praises Jackson for "capturing mood and meaning through minor detail" in lyrics like "From my window I'm staring while my coffee goes cold / Look over there (where?) / There, there's a lady that I used to know / She's married now or engaged or something so I am told". In a call and response, Jackson says "Look over there" and the band responds "Where?"; in live shows, the audience calls often provides the response, which Sarah Larson of The New Yorker recalled made Jackson laugh during a performance.

== Release ==
"Is She Really Going Out with Him?" was initially released as a single in October 1978 with "You Got the Fever" as the B-side. The American single release instead included "(Do the) Instant Mash". This release of the single was unsuccessful on the charts, failing to reach the top 100 in either the UK or the US. Two follow-up singles, "Sunday Papers" and "One More Time", were released, but neither charted. However, when the Look Sharp! album began to gain notoriety and British new wave music grew more popular in the United States, a reissue of the single was released in July 1979 with the new catalogue number AMS 7459. The new release of the single saw much greater success than the initial pressing, reaching number 13 in Britain and number 21 in America. "Is She Really Going Out with Him?" was also a chart success in other nations, reaching the top 10 in Ireland and Canada and the top 20 in Australia and New Zealand. A live a cappella version reached number three on the Dutch Top 40 and number 17 in Belgium.

Since its release, "Is She Really Going Out with Him?" has appeared on compilation albums such as Stepping Out: The Very Best of Joe Jackson, Joe Jackson - Greatest Hits, and This Is It! (The A&M Years 1979–1989). The song was also used in the 1998 romantic comedy film There's Something About Mary.

== Critical reception and legacy ==
"Is She Really Going Out with Him?" saw positive reception during the time of its initial release; Geoffrey Himes of The Washington Post called the song "prime New Wave material" and "one of the best reasons for flipping on the car radio this summer". Cash Box said that it has "a pop-reggae beat, accentuated by the steady bass line, bursting into a catchy pop chorus" and uses minimal instrumentation.

Since then, "Is She Really Going Out with Him?" has been recognized as a classic of new wave. Sarah Larson of The New Yorker called the song one of Jackson's "brilliantly agitated New Wave masterworks", while an author for Billboard dubbed the song one of Jackson's "classics" and "old favorites". Paste Magazine also praised the song, saying, "Only Joe Jackson could turn a song so self-deprecating and sarcastic into something so peppy and upbeat". AllMusic's Huey praised the song's "caustic yet charming witticisms", while the same website's Tom Maginnis called it "the lead salvo from one of the stand out albums of the late 70's New Wave/Pop era". Dave Lifton of Ultimate Classic Rock ranked the song Jackson's second best, highlighting the song's bass line, chorus, and call-and-response.

The song has been described by critics as one of Jackson's most remembered tracks; Paste described the song as "the song Jackson is most remembered for", Maginnis called it "the track that put Joe Jackson on the musical map", and Lifton said it has "proven to be his best-known song". Jackson later wrote, "People still occasionally tell me that this song is the best thing I've ever done. I'm certainly not ashamed of it, and I thank them, but I have to admit I sincerely hope they're not right". In another interview, Jackson said of "Is She Really Going Out with Him?" and his 1982 hit "Steppin' Out", "I wrote them, so I'm biased, and I think they're pretty good. Those songs have been around for so long, and I've played them so many times, it's almost like doing a cover version by some guy I used to know". When asked if audiences at his concerts interrupt to ask for "Is She Really Going Out with Him?", Jackson said, "I mean, that never really happens. I always play it anyway. It's fine with me. You always get a reaction for the best-known songs — that's obvious".

== Live performances ==
"Is She Really Going Out with Him?" has been a mainstay of Jackson's live setlist since its release. Like many of Jackson's songs, "Is She Really Going Out with Him?" has been rearranged in live concerts to align with Jackson's shifting musical interests. These reworkings include an acoustic rendition and an a cappella doo-wop version, performances of which have both been released on Live 1980/86. An a cappella version of "Is She Really Going Out with Him?" was released as a single in 1988 in some European countries. Jackson attributes this tendency to rework his songs to jazz musician Duke Ellington, a musical idol of Jackson's for whom Jackson released a tribute album titled The Duke in 2012; he explained in an interview, "I was ... inspired by Ellington's own philosophy, which he thought the same way about his music – he constantly rearranged and reinvented his own compositions. Sometimes in quite radical ways".

A live version of "Is She Really Going Out with Him?" recorded at the Hammersmith Palais appeared as the B-side on Jackson's 1981 "Beat Crazy" single. Other live renditions have appeared on Two Rainy Nights, Live in Germany 1980, and Live at Rockpalast. Another live version of the song was released on a bonus CD for Jackson's 2003 album Volume 4, performed by a reunited Joe Jackson Band; this reunited lineup also performed the song live on Later... with Jools Holland in 2003.

== Personnel ==
- Joe Jackson – vocals, piano
- Gary Sanford – guitar
- Graham Maby – bass
- David Houghton – drums

Personnel per Look Sharp! liner notes.

== Charts ==
=== Weekly charts ===
Chart (1979)	Peak position
Australia (Kent Music Report)	15
Canada Top Singles (RPM)	9
Ireland (IRMA)	8
Netherlands (Single Top 100)	46
Netherlands (Tipparade)	9
New Zealand (Recorded Music NZ)	18
UK Singles (Official Charts)	13
US Billboard Hot 100	21

Chart (1988)	Peak position
Belgium (Ultratop 50 Flanders)	17
Netherlands (Dutch Top 40)	3
Netherlands (Single Top 100)	5

=== Year-end charts ===
Chart (1979)	Position
Australia (Kent Music Report)	98
Canada Top Singles (RPM)	67

Chart (1988)	Position
Netherlands (Dutch Top 40)	45

== Certifications ==
Region	Certification	Certified units/sales
New Zealand (RMNZ)	Gold	15,000^{‡}
^{‡} Sales+streaming figures based on certification alone.

== Cover versions ==
American ska punk band Goldfinger included a recording of "Is She Really Going Out with Him?" on their 1998 cover album Darrin's Coconut Ass: Live from Omaha. Despite the name of the album, this version of the song is an in-studio recording, like all the others on the album.

American alternative rock band Sugar Ray recorded a cover of "Is She Really Going Out with Him?" on their album In the Pursuit of Leisure. This version reached number 19 on the US Billboard Adult Top 40 Tracks and was used as the theme for the short-lived sitcom I'm with Her. Chuck Taylor of Billboard reviewed the song favourably, saying that McGrath "infuses it with his consistently likeable brand of hand-waving posturing", though Will Levith of Ultimate Classic Rock named the song one of the worst covers ever released and said "the song just misses the heart and soul of the original completely".

Australian pop punk band Kid Courageous released a version of the song as the first single from their album Dear Diary, reaching number 25 on the Australian ARIA Singles Chart. Comedic a cappella singing group Da Vinci's Notebook also recorded a cover of the song, which appeared on their album The Life and Times of Mike Fanning.

The Raconteurs' 2006 song "Steady, As She Goes" has been compared by some critics to "Is She Really Going Out with Him?" for its similar-sounding bass line. Leah Greenblatt of Entertainment Weekly compared the two songs and declared "Is She Really Going Out with Him?" to be the better song, saying, "'Steady' proves [Jack] White's non-Stripes chops (he's not allergic to bass after all!), but Jackson's track is a stone classic".
