= Hope and Fury =

Studio album by Joe Jackson
- Released: 10 April 2026
- Studios: Fuzz Factory (Berlin); Reservoir (New York City)
- Length: 34:44
- Label: earMUSIC
- Producers: Joe Jackson; Patrick Dillett

Joe Jackson chronology
What a Racket! (2023)	Hope and Fury (2026)

Singles from Hope and Fury
- 1. "Welcome to Burning-By-Sea" Released: 10 December 2025; 2. "Fabulous People" Released: 4 February 2026; 3. "After All This Time" Released: 18 March 2026

Hope and Fury is the 22nd studio album by English singer-songwriter and musician Joe Jackson, released by earMUSIC on 10 April 2026.

Jackson has described Hope and Fury as "bicoastal Latin-jazz-funk-rock". He was particularly inspired lyrically by England and the "kind of love-hate relationship" that he has with it.

Jackson embarked on an 80-date tour to promote the album, covering North America between May and July 2026 and Europe between September and December 2026.

== Recording ==
Hope and Fury was recorded at the Fuzz Factory Studio in Berlin and Reservoir Studios in New York City. Jackson recorded demo tracks in Brooklyn prior to the main recording sessions. As he felt he could not improve his lead vocals on some of these demos, Jackson retained the vocal tracks for approximately half of the proper recordings.

== Song information ==
"Welcome to Burning-By-Sea" was inspired by Jackson's observations on modern day England. He started writing the song about Brighton but ended up drawing more inspiration from his hometown of Portsmouth and the contrast between the two cities. He presented the song as being about a fictional seaside town but called it a "microcosm of the whole country". "Fabulous People" was written about an individual who "can't stand the fact that he's a really boring, normal, ordinary white heterosexual guy". Jackson, who called it a "humorous song", was inspired by his 1982 hit song "Steppin' Out" for aspects of the arrangement. "After All This Time" was written about "overcoming the cliché of [a] relationship that breaks up because it gets too difficult". Jackson used a "catalog of clichés" for the verses and then provided a twist in the chorus by having the narrator suggest that they and their partner stay together rather than break up. Jackson examines English society 100 years apart in "End of the Pier", which he has called the album's "saddest" track. The first half of the song is based on a working-class family in 1922 and the second half looks at an equivalent family a century later in the aftermath of the COVID-19 pandemic.

== Critical reception ==
Professional ratings
Review scores
Source	Rating
AllMusic	3.5/5 stars
Mojo	4/5 stars
PopMatters	5/10
The Times	3/5 stars
Uncut	8/10

Upon its release, Will Hodgkinson of The Times summarised, "Jackson's blend of bon mot-laden social observation and heavily percussive pop-funk can grate, but when he fuses a sympathy for the underdog with real originality and invention, he really does mark himself out as a singular and enduring talent." Michael Gallucci, writing for Ultimate Classic Rock, said that, although the album "doesn't fully disregard Jackson's restless musical pursuits", it is "nice to see him on familiar ground from time to time", with songs such as "I'm Not Sorry" and "Fabulous People" being his "most fuss-free in years".

Terry Staunton of Uncut called it a "partial return stylistically to the jazzy pop sophistication" of Night and Day and Body and Soul, but with "more aggressive percussion". He also noted Jackson's "trademark wit". Stephen Thomas Erlewine, writing for Mojo, said Jackson presents himself as a "songwriter who still can be prickly but prefers to be playful". He added that the "deft rhythms help underscore the album's lineage to the cosmopolitan Night and Day", which Jackson "further emphasises with melodic winks to his past".

Jeremy McDonagh of PopMatters said that the album's style "harkens back to the pub rock of I'm the Man, mixing in the salsa flourishes of Night and Day. He considered all of Jackson's "finger-wagging and score-settling" in the lyrics to "sound like a swansong" which, "as a possible final word", "leaves a distinctly bitter aftertaste on an otherwise remarkable career". Mark Deming of AllMusic noted that Hope and Fury "confirms Jackson is still a considerable talent", but felt that the album's "musical excellence" was somewhat eclipsed by the overall theme of the lyrics. He described them as "concern[ing] themselves with various things that clearly annoy him", with Jackson coming across as a "British version of Statler and Waldorf".

== Track listing ==
All tracks are written by Joe Jackson.

No.	Title	Length
1.	"Welcome to Burning-By-Sea"	3:57
2.	"I'm Not Sorry"	2:54
3.	"Made God Laugh"	3:36
4.	"Do Do Do"	2:21
5.	"Fabulous People"	4:02
6.	"After All This Time"	4:21
7.	"The Face"	4:35
8.	"End of the Pier"	5:30
9.	"See You in September"	3:24

== Personnel ==
Credits are adapted from the album's liner notes.

- Joe Jackson – vocals, keyboards, production, artwork concept
- Graham Maby – bass, vocals
- Teddy Kumpel – guitar, vocals
- Doug Yowell – drums, vocals
- Paulo Stagnaro – percussion
- Susan Aquila – violin
- Lourdes Rosales – viola
- Patrick Dillett – production, recording, mixing
- Michael Tibes – recording
- Chris Gehringer – mastering
- Frank Veronsky – photography
- Harry Elliott – photography
- Jason Harrington – digital editing
- Mark Lerner – layout

== Charts ==
Chart performance for Hope and Fury
Chart (2026)	Peak position
Belgian Albums (Ultratop Flanders)	95
Belgian Albums (Ultratop Wallonia)	48
Dutch Albums (Album Top 100)	83
French Physical Albums (SNEP)	44
German Albums (Offizielle Top 100)	32
German Rock & Metal Albums (Offizielle Top 100)	10
Scottish Albums (Official Charts)	47
Swiss Albums (Schweizer Hitparade)	16
UK Album Downloads (Official Charts)	49
UK Albums Sales (OCC)	26
UK Independent Albums (Official Charts)	15
US Top Album Sales (Billboard)	30
