= Night Music (Joe Jackson album) =

Studio album by Joe Jackson
- Released: 3 October 1994
- Genre: Rock, pop, classical music
- Length: 47:39
- Label: Virgin
- Producer: Joe Jackson and Ed Royensdal

Joe Jackson chronology
Laughter & Lust (1991)	Night Music (1994)	Joe Jackson - Greatest Hits (1997)

Professional ratings
Review scores
Source	Rating
AllMusic	1/5 stars
Southtown Star	4.5/5 stars
The Guardian	3/4 stars

Night Music is the 12th studio album by Joe Jackson, released in 1994 on Virgin Records. The album did not chart. Soon after the album's release, Jackson moved to the Sony Classical label.

== Background ==
After the release of his 1991 album Laughter & Lust, Jackson suffered from writer's block for two years. Although his record company, Virgin Records, were expecting him to continue writing contemporary pop material, Jackson decided he had to "go forward and do something fresh" musically, resulting in 1994's Night Music. He was also disappointed with the limited commercial success of Laughter & Lust in the United States.

In a 1997 interview with Billboard, Jackson called Night Music a "breakthrough" in his career after "retir[ing] from the pop mainstream". He described it as "sort of the introverted side of my more mature style". He told Cash Box in 1994, "[The whole album] is sort of a piece. I mean, you really do need to hear the whole thing, and you need to hear the whole thing a few times. And that is, to me, its strength. I'm trying to do something that's beautiful and genuine... that has some soul. I'm in a period of transition in my career where I'm trying to get people to think of me as a composer rather than a pop star."

"Ever After" was released as a promotional single in the Netherlands and Spain. Jackson attributed the record company's picking of the track down to it being "the closest thing to a sort of regular pop song on the record". Jackson has described "Flying" as about "being yourself and becoming free of one's expectations".

== Track listing ==
All songs written and arranged by Joe Jackson.

No.	Title	Length
1.	"Nocturne No. 1"	4:01
2.	"Flying"	2:48
3.	"Ever After"	4:42
4.	"Nocturne No. 2"	4:07
5.	"The Man Who Wrote Danny Boy"	5:18
6.	"Nocturne No. 3"	4:28
7.	"Lullaby"	6:20
8.	"Only the Future"	4:54
9.	"Nocturne No. 4"	6:13
10.	"Sea of Secrets"	5:28

== Personnel ==
Musicians

- Joe Jackson – vocals, acoustic piano, electric piano, organ, various synthesizers, samplers, computer sequencing, celesta, accordion, tom-toms, bells, vibraphone, cymbals, Salvation Army bass drum
- Ed Roynesdal – programming, sampling
- Jean Laurendeau – Ondes Martenot (1, 10)
- Graham Maby – bass guitar (8)
- Gary Burke – drums (3)
- Michael Morreale – trumpet (3)
- Dick Morgan – oboe (6, 10)
- Albert Regni – clarinet (7), bass clarinet (7)
- Tony Aiello – flute (8)
- Mary Rowell – viola (1, 5, 8, 9), violin (9)
- Mary Wootton – cello (9)
- Taylor Carpenter – special guest vocals (3)
- Máire Brennan – special guest vocals (5)
- Renée Fleming – special guest vocals (7)

Production

- Joe Jackson – arrangements, producer
- Ed Roynesdal – producer, engineer
- Carl Glanville – engineer
- Andy Grassi – engineer
- Ken Thomas – engineer
- Charles Harbutt – editing
- Ted Jensen – mastering at Sterling Sound (New York, NY)
- Tony Ungaro – production coordinator
- Len Peltier – art direction, design
- Chip Kidd – design
- Rex Sforza – design
- Robert Flynt – photography
- C. Winston Simone Management – management

== Charts ==
Weekly chart performance for Night Music
Chart (1995)	Peak position
Australian Albums (ARIA)	180

== Covers ==
- Alice Lee covered "Sea Of Secrets" on the 2004 album Different for Girls: Women Artists and Female-Fronted Bands Cover Joe Jackson.
