= Rain (Joe Jackson album) =

2008 studio album by Joe Jackson

Studio album by Joe Jackson
- Released: 28 January 2008
- Studio: Planet Roc (Berlin, Germany)
- Genre: Rock, pop
- Length: 47:41
- Label: Rykodisk
- Producer: Joe Jackson

Joe Jackson chronology
| Afterlife (2004) | Rain (2008) | At the BBC (2009) |

Professional ratings
Review scores
| Source | Rating |
|---|---|
| AllMusic | 3.5/5 stars |
| Crawdaddy! | (mixed) |

Rain is the 17th studio album by Joe Jackson, released in 2008. It was released by Rykodisc on 28 January 2008 in the UK and one day later in the U.S.

Jackson plays piano and sings, and Graham Maby on bass and David Houghton on drums are the only other musicians. The album was recorded at Planet Roc in Berlin, Germany. A limited edition version of the album included a CD and a bonus DVD containing over 40 minutes of material, including concert and behind-the-scenes footage and interviews. Jackson performed a full UK tour in support of the album.

== Track listing ==
All songs written, arranged and produced by Joe Jackson.

| No. | Title | Length |
|---|---|---|
| 1. | "Invisible Man" | 5:07 |
| 2. | "Too Tough" | 4:37 |
| 3. | "Citizen Sane" | 4:20 |
| 4. | "Wasted Time" | 5:10 |
| 5. | "The Uptown Train" | 5:46 |
| 6. | "King Pleasure Time" | 2:47 |
| 7. | "Solo (So Low)" | 5:55 |
| 8. | "Rush Across the Road" | 5:21 |
| 9. | "Good Bad Boy" | 3:18 |
| 10. | "A Place in the Rain" | 5:20 |

A bonus DVD with the album contained the following video recordings:

1. Live from Islington Academy, London: "Invisible Man", "Wasted Time" and "Good Bad Boy"
2. Making the Record
3. Interviews
4. Jackson's Guide to Berlin

== Personnel ==
Musicians

- Joe Jackson – piano, vocals
- Graham Maby – bass, vocals
- David Houghton – drums, vocals

Production

- Joe Jackson – arrangements, producer
- Julie Gardner – recording engineer
- Yensin Jahn – assistant recording engineer
- Sean Slade, Paul Kolderie – mixing engineer
- Ted Young – assistant mixing engineer
- Bob Ludwig – mastering engineer
- Ed Sherman – art direction
- Jim Rakete – photography

== Charts ==
Chart performance for Rain
| Chart (2008) | Peak position |
|---|---|
| Belgian Albums (Ultratop Flanders) | 20 |
| Dutch Albums (Album Top 100) | 12 |
| French Albums (SNEP) | 115 |
| German Albums (Offizielle Top 100) | 44 |
| Italian Albums (Musica e dischi) | 49 |
| Swiss Albums (Schweizer Hitparade) | 99 |
| UK Albums (OCC) | 154 |
| US Billboard 200 | 133 |
| US Independent Albums (Billboard) | 18 |
