= Night and Day II =

Studio album by Joe Jackson
- Released: 24 October 2000
- Genre: Rock
- Length: 46:18
- Label: Sony Classical
- Producer: Joe Jackson

Joe Jackson chronology
Summer in the City: Live in New York (2000)	Night and Day II (2000)	Two Rainy Nights (2002)

Professional ratings
Review scores
Source	Rating
AllMusic	3/5 stars

Night and Day II is the 15th studio album by Joe Jackson, released in 2000. It is a sequel to his 1982 album, Night and Day. It is also a revisit to the style that album, featuring songs about the New York City lifestyle, seen through different characters.

While the original Night and Day took a satirical look at the downfalls of city life through songs such as "TV Age", "Cancer" and "Real Men", Night and Day II focuses primarily on the dark side of inner city living (the song "Happyland", for instance, is about the 1990 arson fire at Happy Land Social Club in the Bronx that killed 87 people) as seen through the eyes of a cynical New Yorker, as Jackson lived in New York at the time.

The cover artwork is a dark nighttime shot taken from within a New York City cab, with the World Trade Center in the background, taken a year prior to 9/11.

The music is built with contributions from Graham Maby (bass), and Sue Hadjopoulos (percussion). Also featured are the string quartet Ethel, and three guest vocalists: Iranian diva Sussan Deyhim, drag performer Dale De Vere and Marianne Faithfull, who sings vocals on "Love Got Lost".

== Track listing ==
All songs written, arranged and produced by Joe Jackson.

No.	Title	Length
1.	"Prelude"	1:57
2.	"Hell of a Town"	3:18
3.	"Stranger Than You"	4:16
4.	"Why" (vocals by Sussan Deyhim)	3:54
5.	"Glamour and Pain" (vocals by Dale De Vere)	5:59
6.	"Dear Mom"	4:12
7.	"Love Got Lost" (vocals by Marianne Faithfull, Joe Jackson and Alexandra Montano)	6:59
8.	"Just Because..."	4:45
9.	"Happyland"	5:12
10.	"Stay"	5:46

== Personnel ==
Musicians

- Joe Jackson – piano, keyboards, synth basses
- Mary Rowell, Todd Reynolds – violin
- Ralph Farris – viola
- Dorothy Lawson – cello
- Graham Maby – bass guitar on "Glamour and Pain", "Love Got Lost" and "Just Because..."
- Sue Hadjopoulos – percussion on "Prelude", "Hell of a Town", "Stranger Than You" and "Happyland"
- Gary Burke – drum kit on "Love Got Lost"
- Sussan Deyhim, Dale De Vere, Marianne Faithfull, Alexandra Montano – vocals

Production

- Joe Jackson – arrangements, producer, sequencing
- Dan Gellert – associate producer, recording engineer
- Charlie Post, Ross Petersen – assistant recording engineer
- Ted Jensen – mastering engineer
- Nitin Vadukul, Alex Vandoros – photography

== Charts ==
Chart (2000)	Peak position
Dutch Albums (Album Top 100)	65
