= Symphony No. 1 (album) =

Studio album by Joe Jackson
- Released: 4 October 1999
- Studio: Avatar Studios, New York City
- Genre: Progressive rock; chamber pop
- Length: 43:37
- Label: Sony Classical
- Producer: Joe Jackson

Joe Jackson chronology
Heaven & Hell (1997)	Symphony No. 1 (1999)	Summer in the City: Live in New York (2000)

Professional ratings
Review scores
Source	Rating
AllMusic	3/5 stars

Symphony No. 1 is the 14th studio album by Joe Jackson, released in 1999. Jackson received a Grammy for Best Pop Instrumental Album in 2001, after several unsuccessful nominations for previous work. Symphony No. 1 was played by a band of jazz and rock musicians including Steve Vai and Terence Blanchard.

== Track listing ==
All tracks were written, arranged and produced by Joe Jackson.

No.	Title	Length
1.	"First Movement"	17:17
2.	"Fast Movement"	7:05
3.	"Slow Movement"	9:01
4.	"Last Movement (Variations)"	10:14

== Personnel ==
Musicians

- Joe Jackson – acoustic piano, keyboards, sampling, computer sequencing
- Steve Vai – electric guitars
- Mat Fieldes – electric bass, acoustic bass
- Gary Burke – drums
- Sue Hadjopoulos – percussion
- Wessell Anderson – alto saxophone
- Patti Monson – flute
- Robin Eubanks – trombone
- Terence Blanchard – trumpet
- Mary Rowell – viola, violin, electric violin

Production

- Joe Jackson – arrangements, producer, liner notes
- Dan Gellert – associate producer, recording, mixing
- Sheldon Steiger – associate producer
- Anthony Ruotolo – assistant engineer
- Ted Jensen – mastering at Sterling Sound (New York, NY)
- Lisa Sharken – guitar technician
- Brian Coleman – production manager
- P.R. Brown – art direction, design
- C. Winston Simone Management – management

== Charts ==
Chart performance for Heaven & Hell
Chart (1999)	Position
US Top Classical Albums (Billboard)	7
US Traditional Classical Albums (Billboard)	7
