= In 20-0-3 =

Single by Joe Jackson
- Released: 16 February 2004
- Recorded: 2004
- Genre: Rock
- Label: Great Big Island
- Songwriter: Joe Jackson

Joe Jackson singles chronology
"Awkward Age" (2003)	"In 20-0-3" (2004)

"In 20-0-3" is a song by the British musician Joe Jackson. It was self-distributed via his personal website and not available on any album.

The lyrics of "In 20-0-3" criticizes the decision of New York mayor Michael Bloomberg in the year 2003 to ban smoking in every bar and club in the city, stating that secondhand smoke was killing 1,000 New Yorkers per year.

"I don't feel like a place is civilised unless they let me smoke, and if they don't let me smoke I feel really insulted. I hate the whole nanny state thing. OK, they're entitled to inform us about things, but after that leave us alone!"

"In 20-0-3" was released in partnership with FOREST (Freedom Organisation for the Right to Enjoy Smoking Tobacco) and was made available to order on Jackson's website. The proceeds of the song went towards fighting smoking bans. Jackson told The Independent in 2004, "I'm one of those songwriters who writes about anything and everything. In this case, I wrote a song about something that made me angry."

Jackson actively campaigned against smoking bans in both the United States and the United Kingdom. In 2005 he published the pamphlet The Smoking Issue and in 2007 the essay Smoke, Lies and the Nanny State.

== Personnel ==
Musicians

- Joe Jackson – piano, organ, vocals
- Steve Hampton – guitar, bass
- Dave Houghton – drums

Production

- Joe Jackson – arrangements, production
- Julie Gardner – recording and mixing engineer
- Bob Bruce – recording engineer
