= Volume 4 (Joe Jackson album) =

Studio album by Joe Jackson Band
- Released: 10 March 2003
- Genre: Rock, pop
- Length: 44:06
- Label: Rykodisc
- Producer: Joe Jackson

Joe Jackson Band chronology
Two Rainy Nights (2002)	Volume 4 (2003)	Afterlife (2004)

Professional ratings
Review scores
Source	Rating
AllMusic	3.5/5 stars
Rolling Stone	3/5 stars

Volume 4 is the 16th studio album by British musician Joe Jackson, released in 2003. It was the first album to feature the Joe Jackson Band since the 1980 release, Beat Crazy, and it was Jackson's first rock 'n' roll album since Laughter and Lust, which was released in 1991. As before, the Joe Jackson Band consisted of Jackson, Graham Maby, David Houghton and Gary Sanford. Jackson said at the time that he expected the songs on the album to be "in the spirit of the first couple of albums, but with a bit of the greater maturity I'd like to think I've acquired. And I've still got a 32-inch waist — so I don't think it's going to be embarrassing".

In another interview, Jackson explained the origins of the album's inception. He said,

Well, we recorded Look Sharp! in August 1978, so this year is our 25th anniversary. So the idea of some kind of reunion was sort of in the air, and I thought it was a terrible idea. To me it just seemed like it would be a cheesy nostalgia trip, and I didn't want to do that. The thing is I had half the songs on this new record already written, and it seemed like they would all fit the band pretty well. So I thought about "What if we did a reunion, but to do something new?" instead of just nostalgia, and make a new album. When I got to the point where I really thought we could make a great new album, and also the other guys were so enthusiastic, I thought, "Well, y'know what? It's silly not to do it." Let's just do it, let's have a laugh, and that's what it's been. It's just been great fun.

It was released to moderately positive reviews. Rolling Stone rated it 3/5, stating that it was less visceral than his early-1980s music, but that "when it comes to edgy, sensitive-guy rock, he proves on Volume 4 that he still is the man." AllMusic rated it 3.5/5, stating that "Volume 4 isn't as lively or vital as his first five albums, but it's also more satisfying as a pop record than anything he's done since Body & Soul, which is more than enough to make it a worthy comeback." The album was followed by a lengthy tour.

== Track listing ==
All songs written, arranged and produced by Joe Jackson.

No.	Title	Length
1.	"Take It Like a Man"	3:24
2.	"Still Alive"	3:42
3.	"Awkward Age"	3:20
4.	"Chrome"	4:20
5.	"Love at First Light"	4:08
6.	"Fairy Dust"	3:47
7.	"Little Bit Stupid"	3:26
8.	"Blue Flame"	5:23
9.	"Dirty Martini"	4:51
10.	"Thugz 'R' Us"	3:23
11.	"Bright Grey"	4:17

A limited edition version of Volume 4 included a bonus CD of live material from the 2002 UK tour.
No.	Title	Length
12.	"One More Time" (live)	3:15
13.	"Is She Really Going Out with Him?" (live)	4:12
14.	"On Your Radio" (live)	5:15
15.	"Got the Time" (live)	3:47
16.	"It's Different for Girls" (live)	4:15
17.	"I'm the Man" (live)	4:21

== Personnel ==
Musicians

- Joe Jackson – piano, organ, electric piano, melodica, lead vocals
- David Houghton – drums, backing vocals
- Graham Maby – bass, backing vocals
- Gary Sanford – guitar, backing vocals

Production

- Joe Jackson - arrangements, producer
- Julie Gardner - recording engineer
- Helen Atkinson - assistant recording engineer
- Sean Slade, Paul Kolderie - mixing engineer
- Juan Garcia - assistant mixing engineer
- Ted Jensen, Nathan James - mastering engineer
- Frank Orlinsky - art direction
- Geoff Spear, Spencer Rowell, Tom Sheehan - photography

== Covers ==
- Dark Blue World covered "Take It Like a Man" on the 2004 album Different for Girls: Women Artists and Female-Fronted Bands Cover Joe Jackson.

== Charts ==
Chart (2003)	Peak position
Belgian Albums (Ultratop Flanders)	34
Dutch Albums (Album Top 100)	27
German Albums (Offizielle Top 100)	49
UK Albums (OCC)	116
US Independent Albums (Billboard)	8

== Reception ==
A review at PopMatters stated: "All said, Volume 4 does not deliver the same type of music as Look Sharp!, but manages to provide a good pop record nonetheless. For fans of Joe Jackson, it’s a welcome arrival — easily his best CD in years, even if the acid stances seem a bit labored at times. He proves he still can master pop songs in a variety of styles, but now you need to invest a little more time to fully appreciate them."
