= I'm the Man (Joe Jackson song) =

1979 single by Joe Jackson

Single by Joe Jackson

from the album I'm the Man
- B-side: "Come On"
- Released: September 1979
- Recorded: March 1979; TW Studios, Fulham, London
- Genre: New wave, punk rock, spiv rock
- Length: 3:58
- Label: A&M Records
- Songwriter(s): Joe Jackson
- Producer(s): David Kershenbaum

Joe Jackson singles chronology
"Fools in Love" (1979)	"I'm the Man" (1979)	"It's Different for Girls" (1979)

"I'm the Man" is a song written and performed by Joe Jackson, appearing on the album of the same name. Written for the album's "spiv rock" theme, the song is a new wave rock track with humorous lyrics.

"I'm the Man" was released as the album's first single, failing to chart in the UK or US but reaching number 23 in Canada. The song has since seen positive critical reception and has appeared on multiple Jackson compilation albums.

== Background ==
"I'm the Man" is based on what Jackson sarcastically described as "spiv rock"; Jackson characterized the image he was describing as a conman who "always wears a gross polka-dot tie and a pencil-thin mustache, and he's always trying to sell you a watch or something like that real cheap". AllMusic critic Tom Maginnis writes that, in the song, "Jackson plays the role of media-savvy flimflam man, willing to promote any latest fad for a buck, like the shady street vendor of trinkets he portrays on the front cover [of the album]". AllMusic's Mike DeGagne writes, "Not only does the track show off Jackson's free-range ability, but his sense of humor arises once again, following in the footsteps of Look Sharp!'s 'Is She Really Going Out with Him?.'" According to Paste Magazine, the song "reference[s] the 'shark-mania' that was still prevalent following the film Jaws".

"I'm the Man" is a fast-paced rocker, described by Maginnis as "a [taut] ball of nervy new wave pop, tumbling straight ahead at breakneck speeds". He also said that the song "follows squarely in the footprints of 'Got the Time' and 'Throw It Away' from Look Sharp!". DeGagne writes, "the frantic 'I'm the Man' showcases Jackson at his most frenzied, as a freight train's worth of lyrics pile haphazardly into one another alongside a wonderfully hysteric rhythm".

== Release ==
At the insistence of Jackson, "I'm the Man" was released as the lead single from I'm the Man in 1979, backed with a cover of the Chuck Berry track, "Come On". The song, despite hitting number 23 in Canada, did not find much chart success elsewhere, failing to chart in both America and Britain, something which frustrated Jackson. Its follow-up, "It's Different for Girls," was more successful, becoming a top 10 hit for Jackson in the UK; Jackson later expressed bemusement at the commercial failure of "I'm the Man" in comparison to its follow-up: "I picked 'I'm The Man' and it flopped. The record company picked 'It's Different For Girls' – I was amazed when that was a hit."

Despite not being a commercial hit, the song has appeared on multiple compilation albums, including Stepping Out: The Very Best of Joe Jackson and This Is It! (The A&M Years 1979–1989). It appeared in live form on the album Live 1980/86. Another live version of the song was released on a bonus CD with Jackson's 2003 album Volume 4.

== Critical reception ==
Upon its release, David Hepworth of Smash Hits wrote, "Joe takes a club to the people who make profits from fads with a bouncing up tempo rocker that loses a bit of its force during the instrumental break. Strong chorus." Danny Baker of NME noted it was "far more frantic than Jackson's singled out before". He felt it wouldn't become a hit "quite as easily" as "Is She Really Going Out with Him?", but thought it would "sit pretty on the old Rockola until it's replaced by a new national rave". Simon Ludgate of Record Mirror was negative in his review, saying the song was "not a patch" on "Is She Really Going Out with Him?" and "sent him to sleep" as Jackson "repeats the line 'I'm the man' so many times, you wonder if he's trying to convince himself by hypnotherapy or something".

In the US, Cash Box felt the "insistently rocking track is new wave at its most palatable, yet Jackson doesn't sacrifice any of the instrumental or lyrical bite for pop gloss". They added that "frenzied guitar and rhythm work make this a choice AOR, pop add." Record World called it an "AOR-pop chartbuster" on which Jackson's a "rock 'n roll firebrand" and "combined with a breakneck rhythm, it works to maximum effect." In 2003, an author for Billboard dubbed the song an "old favorite". Paste called the track "infectious".

== Music video ==
"I'm the Man" was accompanied by a music video, which was Jackson's first. Jackson characterized the process of making the video as "a bit of a laugh" and recalled that the video was made "very cheaply, very quickly". He explained that the process "seemed like fun", particularly compared to his negative experiences producing videos for singles from his 1982 album, Night and Day. Jackson later became an opponent of music videos during the 1980s, refusing to make videos for a period before relenting in the late 1980s.

== Charts ==
=== Weekly charts ===
Chart (1979)	Peak position
Canada	23
UK The Singles Chart (Record Business)	84

=== Year-end charts ===
Chart (1979)	Peak position
Canada	183

== Cover versions ==
American alternative rock band Silversun Pickups released a cover of "I'm the Man" as a standalone single in 2023. The cover was recorded for the television series The Lincoln Lawyer, appearing in the trailer for the program's second season.

"I'm the Man" was also covered by the ska punk band Buck-O-Nine on their album Twenty-Eight Teeth, which was released in 1997.
