= Fast Forward (Joe Jackson album) =

Studio album by Joe Jackson
- Released: 2 October 2015
- Genres: Rock, pop
- Length: 71:26
- Label: Caroline
- Producer: Joe Jackson

Joe Jackson chronology
Steppin' Out - The Collection (2014)	Fast Forward (2015)	Fool (2019)

Professional ratings
Review scores
Source	Rating
AllMusic	4/5 stars
Ultimate Classic Rock	Positive
The Villager	Positive
WaxonTape	9/10 stars

Fast Forward is the 19th studio album by British singer-songwriter Joe Jackson. The album and tracklist were officially announced via Jackson's official website and was scheduled for a mid-fall release. The record was later released worldwide on 2 October 2015. Excluding his classical releases and film work, the album is his thirteenth studio project.

The album was developed out of plans for a series of four-track EPs, each relating to a specific city. Eventually, the EPs were combined and arranged into a full-length studio album. The four cities represented are New York City, Berlin, Amsterdam, and New Orleans, with each of the city's specific tracks having been arranged and recorded there. Jackson worked with a different set of musicians in each location. There are two covers on the album, a remake of Television's "See No Evil", and a rendition of the 1930s German cabaret song "Good Bye Johnny".

On 14 July 2015, Jackson released "A Little Smile" as an album teaser via the Caroline Music YouTube channel. On 13 August the album's first single, the titular "Fast Forward", was uploaded on SoundCloud.

== Track listing ==
All songs written and arranged by Joe Jackson, except where noted.

New York
No.	Title	Writer(s)	Length
1.	"Fast Forward"		6:02
2.	"If It Wasn't For You"		3:39
3.	"See No Evil"	Tom Verlaine	4:08
4.	"Kings of the City"		5:22

Amsterdam
No.	Title	Length
5.	"A Little Smile"	4:00
6.	"Far Away"	4:02
7.	"So You Say"	2:52
8.	"Poor Thing"	3:32

Berlin
No.	Title	Writer(s)	Length
9.	"Junkie Diva"		5:38
10.	"If I Could See Your Face"		4:19
11.	"The Blue Time"		5:31
12.	"Good Bye Jonny"	Peter Kreuder; English arrangement by Hans Fritz Beckmann and Joe Jackson	5:41

New Orleans
No.	Title	Length
13.	"Neon Rain"	3:35
14.	"Satellite"	4:24
15.	"Keep On Dreaming"	4:17
16.	"Ode to Joy"	4:16

== Personnel ==
Musicians

- Joe Jackson

-- Performing on the New York recording
- Regina Carter - violin
- Bill Frisell - guitar
- Brian Blade - drums
- Graham Maby - bass, vocals
-- Performing on the Amsterdam recording
- Aram Kersbergen - bass
- Benedikt Enzler - cello
- Stefan Kruger - drums
- Mitchell Sink - vocals
- Guido Nijs - saxophone
- Jan Van Duikeren - trumpet
- Edith Van Moergastel - viola
- Borika Van Den Booren, Michael Waterman - violin
- Claus Tofft - percussion
-- Performing on the Berlin recording
- Greg Cohen - bass
- Earl Harvin - drums
- Dirk Berger - guitar
- Markus Ehrlich - tenor saxophone
- Dima Bondarev - trumpet
-- Performing on the New Orleans recording
- Donald Harrison, Jr. - alto saxophone
- Robert Mercurio - bass
- Stanton Moore - drums
- Jeffrey Raines - guitar
- Big Sam Williams - trombone
- John Michael Bradford - trumpet

Production

- Joe Jackson - arrangements, producer
- Patrick 'Pat' Dillett - recording engineer (New York)
- Kasper Frenkel - recording engineer (Amsterdam)
- Misha Kachkachishvili - recording engineer (New Orleans)

== Charts ==
Chart (2015)	Peak position
Belgian Albums (Ultratop Flanders)	20
Belgian Albums (Ultratop Wallonia)	72
Dutch Albums (Album Top 100)	11
German Albums (Offizielle Top 100)	54
UK Albums (Official Charts)	96
UK Independent Albums (Official Charts)	24
US Independent Albums (Billboard)	27
US Top Rock Albums (Billboard)	45
US Indie Store Album Sales (Billboard)	25
