= Fools in Love =

Single by Joe Jackson

from the album Look Sharp!
- B-side: "Throw It Away"
- Released: June 1979 (NL)
- Recorded: 1978
- Genre: Reggae rock; new wave
- Length: 4:23
- Label: A&M
- Songwriter: Joe Jackson
- Producer: David Kershenbaum

Joe Jackson singles chronology
"One More Time" (1979)	"Fools in Love" (1979)	"I'm the Man" (1979)

"Fools in Love" is a song by British new wave musician Joe Jackson. It was released on his debut album, Look Sharp! in 1979. Written while Jackson was a member of his earlier band Koffee & Kream, the song represented a departure from that band's style and was indicative of Jackson's move in a more cynical direction.

"Fools in Love" was released as a single in the Netherlands, but saw no chart success. The song has since seen positive reception from critics.

== Background ==
"Fools in Love" was written by Joe Jackson before he founded the Joe Jackson Band. At the time, he was a member of a band called Koffee & Kream, a band whose music he described as "schmaltz". As he recalled in his autobiography, Jackson wrote "Fools in Love" as a "rebellion" against his then-current band's music, citing the song as an instance of his new style emerging.

Over a looping reggae bassline, which I hoped was vaguely sinister, I catalogued all the sick and deluded things that lovers did to each other, but ended each chorus with a twist: "I should know because this fool's in love again". I wasn't in love, but the juxtaposition of the romantic and the cynical suited my new style to a tee.

— Joe Jackson

== Release ==
"Fools in Love" was first released on Look Sharp! in 1979. The song was released as the third single from the album in the Netherlands in June 1979, instead of the third single choice in Britain, "One More Time". The B-side of the single was "Throw It Away", another song from the Look Sharp! album. The single failed to chart.

AllMusic's Steve Huey praised the song's "caustic yet charming witticisms".

== Live performances ==
"Fools in Love" has been performed by Jackson multiple times. At a live performance at Rockpalast, Jackson described the song as one that "people like" to hear live. This performance later appeared on Live at Rockpalast. Paste Magazine published the audio from a 1979 performance at the Berklee Performance Center in Boston.

== Charts ==
Chart (1979)	Peak position
CMJ College Radio Tracks	9

== Inara George version ==
Inara George released a version of "Fools in Love" on her 2005 album All Rise.
