= Got the Time =

1979 song by Joe Jackson

Song by Joe Jackson

from the album Look Sharp!
- Released: 5 January 1979
- Recorded: 1978, Eden Studios, London, England
- Genre: Punk rock; new wave
- Length: 2:55
- Label: A&M
- Songwriter: Joe Jackson
- Producer: David Kershenbaum

"Got the Time" is a song written and performed by the British new wave musician Joe Jackson, appearing as the closing track on his 1979 debut album, Look Sharp!. The song has since been performed frequently in live concerts by Jackson.

The song was covered in 1990 by thrash metal band Anthrax and in 2021 by Finnish folk metal band Korpiklaani.

== Background ==
Jackson had written "Got the Time" in 1977 before assembling the final version of the Joe Jackson Band. Jackson recalled the driving nature of the song was a struggle for his then drummer, Dave Cairns. Jackson explained in his memoir A Cure for Gravity:

"'Got the Time'... gave Dave a lot of trouble. The style I wanted—fast, sharp, and intense—was a long way from Dave's loose, funky approach. This was one guy, I thought, who might not survive the transition to new wave".

In a live performance at Rock Goes to College, Jackson dedicated the song to "anyone out there who leads a hectic life". In the lyrics of the song, Jackson sings of a frantic lifestyle where he is constantly being encountered by new obligations and duties. Musically, the song is a fast-paced rock song with vocals by Jackson. He later described the song as "fast and frantic". In later live versions of the song (after Jackson split from the Joe Jackson Band), percussionist Sue Hadjopoulos plays a prominent conga rhythm.

== Release and reception ==
The song was first released on Look Sharp!, and has since seen many other releases. A 1980 live version from the Beat Crazy tour appeared on the live album Live 1980/86, and a 2004 version appeared on Afterlife. A live performance was also released on a bonus CD with Jackson's 2003 album Volume 4. A live form of the song appeared on the compilation album This Is It! (The A&M Years 1979–1989). For the version that appeared on Live Music - Europe 2010, Jackson rearranged the song to not include guitar, since his touring band consisted of only Graham Maby and Dave Houghton. He explained, "I found it a tough one, ... which is why we left out the piano. My idea was to make the rhythm section overwhelming and really let them go crazy, to the point where you wouldn't miss anything else. So you just really have the bass and drums and the vocal, and it works."

In 2003, a writer for Billboard dubbed the song a "classic" and an "old favorite". Paste Magazine praised the song's "manic energy". Glide Magazine ranked it as Jackson's 10th best song.

== Personnel ==
- Joe Jackson – vocals
- Gary Sanford – guitar
- Graham Maby – bass
- David Houghton – drums

== Charts ==
Chart (1979)	Peak position
CMJ College Radio Tracks	#11

== Cover versions ==
=== Anthrax version ===
"Got the Time"

Single by Anthrax

from the album Persistence of Time
- Released: 1990
- Recorded: December 1989–February 1990, A&M Studios and Conway Studios, Hollywood / Soundtrack Studios, New York City
- Genre: Punk metal
- Length: 2:44
- Label: Megaforce, Island
- Songwriter: Joe Jackson
- Producers: Anthrax, Mark Dodson, Jon Zazula, Marsha Zazula

Anthrax singles chronology
"Antisocial" (1989)	"Got the Time" (1990)	"In My World" (1990)

"Got the Time" was covered by the American thrash metal band Anthrax on their album, Persistence of Time. This version was also released as a single by the band in 1990. The band's version was cited by AllMusic writer Steve Huey as the "standout track" from Persistence of Time.

Jackson did not hold Anthrax's version in high regard. In the June 1991 issue of Q magazine, Jackson remarked: "I think it sounds kind of clumsy compared to the way we did it on the Live album. I mean, our version is really smoking. Theirs is actually slower than ours, and kind of lumpen. The way I feel about it is, Thanks for the royalties, guys." In another interview, he explained, "I could never quite understand why they were called a 'speed metal' band because we played the song about twice as fast as they did."

Personnel

- Joey Belladonna – lead vocals
- Scott Ian – lead guitar, backing vocals
- Dan Spitz – rhythm guitar, backing vocals
- Frank Bello – bass, backing vocals
- Charlie Benante – drums

Charts

Chart (1991)	Peak position
UK Singles (OCC)	16

=== Other cover versions ===
- Perfect Thyroid covered "Got the Time" on their 1997 album Musical Barnacles.
- The Donots did a cover of "Got the Time" in 2002.
- The Matches recorded a cover of "Got the Time" in 2004. A live version appeared on their 2016 live album Recomposer.
- Both Beth Thornley and Fabulous Disaster covered "Got the Time" on the 2004 album Different for Girls: Women Artists and Female-Fronted Bands Cover Joe Jackson.
- Brenda Earl Stokes covered "Got the Time" on her 2014 album Right About Now.
- Folk metal band Korpiklaani released a version with new Finnish lyrics, entitled "Ennen" in 2021. They also released cover with English lyrics; "a cover version of ANTHRAX's version of the original song written by Joe Jackson" according to the description text of the video release on Youtube.
