= The Duke (Joe Jackson album) =

Studio album by Joe Jackson
- Released: 22 June 2012
- Recorded: 2011
- Genre: Jazz, sophisti-pop
- Length: 47:38
- Label: earMUSIC, Razor & Tie
- Producer: Joe Jackson

Joe Jackson chronology
Live at Rockplast (2012)	The Duke (2012)	Steppin' Out - The Collection (2014)

Professional ratings
Aggregate scores
Source	Rating
Metacritic	59/100
Review scores
Source	Rating
AllMusic	2.5/5 stars
Consequence of Sound	D−
Rolling Stone	3/5 stars

The Duke is the 18th studio album by English musician Joe Jackson. The album was first released on 22 June 2012 in Continental Europe by earMUSIC and was released in the US on 26 June by Razor & Tie Recordings.

The album is a tribute to Duke Ellington, the American composer, pianist, and bandleader of a jazz orchestra.

Upon its release, The Duke received generally positive reviews from music critics. At Metacritic, which assigns a normalized rating out of 100 to reviews from mainstream critics, the album received an average score of 59 based on 10 reviews, which indicates "mixed or average reviews".

The album debuted at No. 93 on the Billboard 200, and No. 1 on the Top Jazz Albums chart, selling around 5,000 copies in its first week of release. The album has sold 13,000 copies in the United States as of September 2015.

== Track listing ==
All songs arranged and produced by Joe Jackson.

No.	Title	Writer(s)	Length
1.	"Isfahan"	Ellington, Strayhorn	5:03
2.	"Caravan"	Ellington, Tizol, Mills	6:01
3.	"I'm Beginning to See the Light / Take the "A" Train / Cotton Tail"	Ellington, George / Strayhorn / Ellington	3:34
4.	"Mood Indigo"	Ellington, Mills, Bigard	4:04
5.	"Rockin' in Rhythm"	Ellington	3:28
6.	"I Ain't Got Nothin' but the Blues / Do Nothin' 'Til You Hear from Me"	Ellington, George / Ellington, Russell	5:14
7.	"I Got It Bad (and That Ain't Good)"	Ellington, Webster	4:48
8.	"Perdido / Satin Doll" (featuring Zuco 103)	Tizol, Lenk, Drake / Ellington, Mercer, Strayhorn	4:49
9.	"The Mooche / Black and Tan Fantasy"	Ellington, Miley / Ellington	5:26
10.	"It Don't Mean a Thing (If It Ain't Got That Swing)" (featuring Iggy Pop)	Ellington, Mills	5:11

== Personnel ==
Musicians

- Joe Jackson – piano, keyboards, stylophone, synthesizer, accordion, tom-toms, melodica, vibraphone, vocals
- Steve Vai - guitar on "Isfahan" and "The Mooche / Black and Tan Fantasy"
- Kris Ingram Lanzaro - synthesizers, drum programming, sound design, on "Isfahan" and "It Don't Mean a Thing (If It Ain't Got That Swing)", Production Assistant for whole album.
- Sussan Deyhim - vocals on "Caravan"
- Vinnie Zummo - guitars on "Caravan", "I'm Beginning to See the Light / Take the "A" Train / Cotton Tail" and "Mood Indigo", harmonica on "Mood Indigo", "I Got It Bad (And That Ain't Good)", "Perdido / Satin Doll", "The Mooche / Black and Tan Fantasy" and "It Don't Mean a Thing (If It Ain't Got That Swing)"
- Mary Rowell - violin on "Caravan", "I Got It Bad (And That Ain't Good)" and "The Mooche / Black and Tan Fantasy"
- Cornelius Dufallo - violin on "Caravan", "The Mooche / Black and Tan Fantasy" and "I Got It Bad (And That Ain't Good)"
- Ralph Farris - viola on "Caravan", "I Got It Bad (And That Ain't Good)" and "The Mooche / Black and Tan Fantasy"
- Dorothy Lawson - cello on "Caravan", "I Got It Bad (And That Ain't Good)" and "The Mooche / Black and Tan Fantasy"
- Christian McBride - bass guitar on "Caravan", "The Mooche / Black and Tan Fantasy" and "It Don't Mean a Thing (If It Ain't Got That Swing)", acoustic bass on "I'm Beginning to See the Light / Take the "A" Train / Cotton Tail" and "I Ain't Got Nothin' But the Blues / Do Nothin' 'Til You Hear from Me"
- Ahmir '?uestlove' Thompson - drums on "Caravan", "I'm Beginning to See the Light / Take the "A" Train / Cotton Tail", "Mood Indigo", "Rockin' In Rhythm", "I Ain't Got Nothin' But the Blues / Do Nothin' 'Til You Hear from Me" and "The Mooche / Black and Tan Fantasy"
- Sue Hadjopoulos – congas and bongos on "Caravan", "I'm Beginning to See the Light / Take the "A" Train / Cotton Tail" and "I Got It Bad (And That Ain't Good)"
- Regina Carter - violin on "I'm Beginning to See the Light / Take the "A" Train / Cotton Tail", "Mood Indigo" and "It Don't Mean a Thing (If It Ain't Got That Swing)"
- Tony Aiello - piccolo on "Rockin' In Rhythm"
- Damon Bryson - sousaphone on "Rockin' In Rhythm"
- Sharon Jones - vocals on "I Ain't Got Nothin' But the Blues / Do Nothin' 'Til You Hear from Me"
- Kirk Douglas - guitar on "I Ain't Got Nothin' But the Blues / Do Nothin' 'Til You Hear from Me"
- Lilian Vieira - vocals on "Perdido / Satin Doll", 'doo wah' vocals on "It Don't Mean a Thing (If It Ain't Got That Swing)"
- Stefan Kruger - drums and percussion on "Perdido / Satin Doll" and "It Don't Mean a Thing (If It Ain't Got That Swing)"
- Iggy Pop - vocals on "It Don't Mean a Thing (If It Ain't Got That Swing)"
- Stefan Schmid - synthesizer on "It Don't Mean a Thing (If It Ain't Got That Swing)"

Production

- Joe Jackson - arrangements, producer, recording engineer
- Akahiro Nishimura - assistant recording engineer
- Ted Jensen - mastering engineer
- Ed Sherman - art direction
- Frank Veronsky - photography
- Maurice Seymour, William P. Gottlieb - photos of Duke Ellington

== Charts ==
=== Weekly charts ===
Weekly chart performance for The Duke
Chart (2012)	Peak position
Belgian Albums (Ultratop Flanders)	70
Belgian Albums (Ultratop Wallonia)	109
Dutch Albums (Album Top 100)	21
German Albums (Offizielle Top 100)	33
Swiss Albums (Schweizer Hitparade)	49
UK Independent Albums (OCC)	48
US Billboard 200	93
US Top Contemporary Jazz Albums (Billboard)	1
US Top Jazz Albums (Billboard)	1

=== Year-end charts ===
Year-end chart performance for The Duke
Chart (2012)	Position
US Top Contemporary Jazz Albums (Billboard)	14
US Top Jazz Albums (Billboard)	34
