= One More Time (Joe Jackson song) =

Single by Joe Jackson

from the album Look Sharp!
- B-side: "Don't Ask Me"
- Released: 18 May 1979
- Recorded: 1978
- Genre: Rock, new wave
- Length: 3:15
- Label: A&M - AMS 7433
- Songwriter: Joe Jackson
- Producer: David Kershenbaum

Joe Jackson singles chronology
"Sunday Papers" (1979)	"One More Time" (1979)	"Fools in Love" (1979)

"One More Time" is a song by the British new wave musician Joe Jackson. It was released as the third single from his debut album, Look Sharp!, in 1979. Inspired by a breakup Jackson had, the song features a guitar riff and lyrics detailing a collapsing relationship.

"One More Time" was released as a single, but did not see any chart success. The song has since been highlighted as one of the best off Look Sharp! and Graham Maby's bassline has been singled out as praiseworthy.

== Background ==
"One More Time" was written by Jackson after a breakup with his girlfriend Jill. Jackson recalled that he embellished on the end of that relationship as the song developed. He explained in his autobiography, A Cure for Gravity:

I bought a cheap secondhand upright piano and worked on a song called 'One More Time', with a driving guitar riff and anguished lyrics about the end of a relationship. The guy can't believe the girl wants to leave: Tell me one more time, he says, one more time, one more time. I'd taken a little piece of my breakup with Jill, one moment, one feeling, and embellished it into something else. I guess that's how fiction works: not creating something false, but creating new truths out of bits of old ones. Just as we create new music by endlessly reshuffling the same old chords and scales.

— Joe Jackson

The lyrics of "One More Time" feature the singer asking his ex-lover to truthfully tell him that she never loved him. Musically, the song is one of Jackson's more aggressive rock songs, featuring Joe Jackson on lead vocals and a prominent guitar riff to open the song.

== Release ==
"One More Time" was released as the follow-up single to "Sunday Papers," also from Look Sharp!, in May 1979. Backed with the non-album track "Don't Ask Me" (which later appeared as a bonus track on some releases of Look Sharp!), the single, like "Sunday Papers," was unable to chart in Britain. The single was not released in America or any countries in continental Europe, although an alternate single, "Fools in Love," was released in the Netherlands in June 1979.

A live version of the song was released on a bonus CD with Jackson's 2003 album Volume 4.

== Reception ==
Cliff White of Smash Hits praised the production and musicianship as the song's "outstanding qualities". He noted, "Mixed so well, the power of the bass and lead guitar takes your mind off the fact that Joe is singing a fairly routine love song." Paul Sexton of Record Mirror described the song as "biting and precise", and considered it to have commercial potential. Peter Trollope of the Liverpool Echo noted the song "doesn't waste time before ramming the message home with some tough guitar work". He felt it lacked the "commercial appeal" of Jackson's previous two singles, but added "it still has enough going for it to suggest that Joe is going to be this year's thing".

Rolling Stone critic Bud Scoppa described "One More Time" as a "welcome merger of edginess and ear candy, which connected immediately with fans who couldn't abide the brutal fun of 'God Save the Queen.'" Josh Jackson of Paste Magazine said the song "reveal[s] the more caustic side of Jackson's songwriting, of which he wouldn't quite tap into again". In 2003, an author for Billboard dubbed the song an "old favorite".

Ultimate Classic Rock's Dave Lifton ranked the song number five on his list of the "Top 10 Joe Jackson Songs", noting that the placement was "a tribute to [bassist Graham] Maby, because no matter how many times we've listened to it, we can never predict where he's going". Glide Magazine ranked it as Jackson's 9th best song.

== Charts ==
Chart (1979)	Peak position
UK The Singles Chart (Record Business)	90
