= A Slow Song =

1983 single by Joe Jackson

Single by Joe Jackson

from the album Night and Day
- B-side: "Real Men"
- Released: June 1983
- Studio: Blue Rock, New York City
- Length: 7:13
- Label: A&M
- Songwriter: Joe Jackson
- Producers: Joe Jackson; David Kershenbaum

Joe Jackson singles chronology
"Another World" (1983)	"A Slow Song" (1983)	"Cosmopolitan" (1983)

"A Slow Song" is a song by British singer-songwriter and musician Joe Jackson, which was released in 1982 as the closing track on his fifth studio album Night and Day. The song was written by Jackson, and produced by Jackson and David Kershenbaum.

In 1983, "A Slow Song" was released as a single in the UK, becoming the fifth and final single to be taken from Night and Day. It was not a commercial success as a single, but received positive critical reception. The song has been Jackson's regular concert finisher since 1982.

== Background ==
Jackson has described "A Slow Song" as a "romantic song". In his introduction of the song during a 1983 performance, Jackson said: "It's all about being with the one you love, that special person, late one night, winding down and just waiting for the right song to have a slow dance to. [Do] you remember when the DJ at the end of the evening used to play a slow song? They don't seem to do it anymore. So if you've been in this situation, you'll understand why I wrote this song."

== Critical reception ==
Upon its release as a single, Lenny Juviski of The Northern Echo praised the song as the "best track" from the "excellent" Night and Day album, and believed it would return Jackson to the top 10. He added, "It starts off slowly, building into a controlled crescendo, with Joe bashing out some fine piano."

In a contemporary review of "Night and Day", Jim Bohen of the Daily Record described "A Slow Song" as an "impassioned ballad" which contains an organ solo "as eloquent as the lyric". Paul Willistein of The Morning Call considered the song to be "an exquisite and powerful commentary on much of contemporary pop presented as re-working of the old saw 'Music has charms to soothe the savage beast'." Mike Daly of The Age described the song a "gently rocking plea for relief from high-energy music" and praised the "nice bridging organ" and chorus' "superb hook".

George Kanzler of the Newhouse News Service noted Jackson's vocal performance as being "delivered in a barely held-back heavy metal singer's tone, as if Robert Plant were trying to cover Dan Fogelberg". Brett Milano of The Boston Globe praised Jackson's vocal as being "his strongest on record" and noted the song's "dramatic buildup".

In 2015, Dave Lifton of Ultimate Classic Rock picked "A Slow Song" as his number-one choice in a feature on Joe Jackson's top ten songs. Lifton considered the song to "owe more than a nod" to "Unchained Melody" and noted the "gorgeously cathartic climax".

== Track listing ==
7" single

1. "A Slow Song" - 7:13
2. "Real Men" - 4:05

== Personnel ==
- Joe Jackson – vocals, keyboards
- Graham Maby – bass
- Larry Tolfree – drums
- Sue Hadjopoulos – percussion
- Ed Rynesdal – violin

Production

- Joe Jackson – producer, mixing
- David Kershenbaum – producer, mixing
- Michael Ewasko – engineer
- Ken Tracht - assistant engineer

Other

- Alan Ballard, Gary Green – photography

== Charts ==
Chart (1983)	Peak position
UK Singles Chart	195
