= Breaking Us in Two =

Single by Joe Jackson

from the album Night and Day
- B-side: "Target"
- Released: 13 August 1982; 18 February 1983 (Reissue)
- Recorded: 1982
- Studio: Blue Rock, New York City
- Genre: Sophisti-pop
- Length: 4:35 (album version); 3:45 (single version)
- Label: A&M
- Songwriter: Joe Jackson
- Producers: Joe Jackson, David Kershenbaum

Joe Jackson singles chronology
"Steppin' Out" (1982)	"Breaking Us in Two" (1982)	"Another World" (1982)

Music video
- "Breaking Us in Two" on YouTube

"Breaking Us in Two" is a song by British musician Joe Jackson. It was the third of three charting singles from his 1982 LP, Night and Day.

The single was released in the UK on 13 August 1982, backed with the Spanish version of "Target" renamed "El Blanco" (target in Spanish). In the US, the B-side was the regular English version of "Target". The single began to get radio airplay in late 1982 and early 1983, especially in the US where the music video was in medium rotation on MTV in early February. The single had become a hit in the US, reaching number 18 on the Billboard Hot 100 the week of March 19, 1983. Later, it reached number 40 in Canada. It also charted in the UK and Australia. It was a bigger Adult Contemporary hit, reaching number eight in the U.S. and number 12 in Canada.

The music video was filmed on location in and around the Oakworth railway station, on the Keighley & Worth Valley Railway, featuring a train being pulled by the Hudswell Clarke 0-6-0T No. 31 "Hamburg".

== Reception ==
Upon its release as a single, Charles Shaar Murray of the NME called "Breaking Us in Two" "one of those 'Let's sit down and have a serious talk about our relationship' songs for which Jackson is so justly famous". He added, "This one is pleasant rather than stirring, a medium-paced toe-tapper with suitably anguished lyrics and some fairly stylish piano playing." Geoff Barton of Sounds was negative, describing the "miserable, depressing, mournful ballad" as an "ugly grey stain in the Dalmatians' colourful world". Edwyn Collins, as a guest reviewer for Melody Maker, said, "This is another song that's just full of cliches. It's almost a pastiche. It's just so mediocre. If you heard it on the radio it would be some totally ambient background noise. Brian Eno would be proud of him."

In the US, Billboard said it was "jazzy and precise [and] similar in tone to the top 10 'Steppin' Out'."

== Chart history ==
=== Weekly charts ===
Chart (1982–1983)	Peak position
Australia (Kent Music Report)	90
Canada RPM Top Singles	40
Canada RPM Adult Contemporary	12
Ireland (IRMA)	26
New Zealand	35
UK (The Official Charts Company)	59
US Billboard Hot 100	18
US Billboard Adult Contemporary	8
US Cash Box Top 100	17

=== Year-end charts ===
Chart (1983)	Rank
US Top Pop Singles (Billboard)	99
