= Real Men (song) =

Single by Joe Jackson

from the album Night and Day
- B-side: "Chinatown"
- Released: 11 June 1982
- Studio: Blue Rock, New York City
- Genre: Power pop
- Length: 4:03
- Label: A&M
- Songwriter: Joe Jackson
- Producers: Joe Jackson; David Kershenbaum

Joe Jackson singles chronology
"Jumpin' Jive" (1981)	"Real Men" (1982)	"Steppin' Out" (1982)

"Real Men" is a song by the English singer-songwriter and musician Joe Jackson, released in 1982 as the lead single from his fifth studio album, Night and Day. The song was written by Jackson, and was produced by Jackson and David Kershenbaum. Although "Real Men" only reached number 89 in the UK singles chart, it became a hit in the Dutch language area, as well as Australia where it peaked at number 6. The song was covered by Tori Amos on her 2001 album of gender-swapped covers, Strange Little Girls.

== Background ==
Jackson has described "Real Men" as being about the "age old battle of the sexes". He told Billboard in 1982, "I think your average male has had his masculinity and supremacy threatened to the point where he's not sure what it is he's supposed to do. Intelligent, forward thinking, in the sexual arena, is being done by women. It's all about the way stereotypes have reversed, turned upside down and become meaningless." The song has also been described as examining the themes of sexuality and male sexual attraction to other men.

Jackson believed the lyrics remained relevant years later, when he told BBC Radio 2 in 1998, "I still think very much people don't know what a real man is anymore. What is the role of a man? How is a man supposed to be? I think we're in this period of transition of redefining the sexes, which is really interesting to me."

== Music video ==
The song's music video was directed by Steve Barron.

== Critical reception ==
Upon its release as a single, Neil Tennant, writing for Smash Hits, considered "Real Men" as a return to the "small-guy bitterness" of Jackson's early records. He called it a "tough, piano-backed ballad" that "spits and scratches" and sees Jackson "kick sand in the faces of macho men". Mike Nicholls of Record Mirror called it a "portentous thought-provoking ditty" with a "nice tune", "mighty sturm-und-drang production" and lyrics "intoned with so much of his usual boring venom one loses the drift of whatever the hell it is he's on about". Frank Edmonds of the Bury Free Press felt the "terribly earnest and meaningful song" is "far too serious to be entertaining".

In a review of Night and Day, Mike Day of The Age considered "Real Men" to be a "superbly grandiose creation" with "Phil Spector-style piano", a "wailing vocal chorus that is vintage Springsteen", "echoing drums" and lyrics that "cut a swathe through male chauvinism". Susan Molloy of The Sydney Morning Herald described it as "lyrically one of the most outrageous songs for a long time" which "seemingly ends with a plea for grass-roots heterosexuality". Alan Kellogg of the Edmonton Journal noted the "sheer lyric depth" and "brittle intensity", adding it was "a song for the Eighties if there ever was one". Stephen Holden of Rolling Stone commented that it "solemnly blends string chamber music with echoes of Phil Spector, as Jackson sorts out the contradiction between the traditional male role of warrior and today's macho gay culture".

In 2015, Kevin Wuench of Tampa Bay Times said of the song's lyrical message: "'Real Men' is not so much pro-gay song but more an open-ended song that asks the listener to make their own definition of what makes a real man". Stephen Thomas Erlewine of AllMusic described the song as "haunting" in a retrospective review of Night and Day.

== Track listing ==
7-inch single

1. "Real Men" – 4:03
2. "Chinatown" – 4:26

12-inch single (The Real Men EP, Dutch release)

1. "Real Men" – 4:05
2. "El Cancer" – 6:06
3. "El Blanco" – 3:52
4. "Un Otro Mundo" – 4:00

== Personnel ==
- Joe Jackson – vocals, keyboards
- Graham Maby – bass
- Larry Tolfree – drums
- Sue Hadjopoulos – percussion
- Ed Rynesdal – violin

Production

- Joe Jackson – producer, mixing
- David Kershenbaum – producer, mixing
- Michael Ewasko – engineer

Other

- Gary Green – photography

== Charts ==
=== Weekly charts ===
Chart (1982)	Peak position
Australia (Kent Music Report)	6
Belgium (Ultratop 50 Flanders)	25
Netherlands (Dutch Top 40)	15
Netherlands (Single Top 100)	17
New Zealand (Recorded Music NZ)	48
UK Singles (Official Charts Company)	89

=== Year-end charts ===
Chart (1982)	Rank
Australia (Kent Music Report)	48
