= Look Sharp! (Joe Jackson album) =

Studio album by Joe Jackson
- Released: January 29, 1979
- Recorded: August 1978
- Studio: Eden (London)
- Genres: New wave; pub rock
- Length: 36:28
- Labels: A&M; AMLH 64743; A&M/PolyGram Records; 214 743; A&M/Universal Records; 586 194 (2001 reissue)
- Producer: David Kershenbaum

Joe Jackson chronology
Look Sharp! (1979)	I'm the Man (1979)

Singles from Look Sharp!
- 1. "Is She Really Going Out with Him?" Released: October 1978; 2. "Sunday Papers" Released: February 1979; 3. "One More Time" Released: 18 May 1979; 4. "Fools in Love" Released: June 1979 (NL)

Look Sharp! is the debut album by Joe Jackson, released in January 1979. The album features one of Jackson's most well-known songs, "Is She Really Going Out with Him?", as well as the title track "Look Sharp", "Sunday Papers", "One More Time" and "Fools in Love".

The cover, featuring a pair of white shoes, ranked number 22 on Rolling Stone's list of the 100 greatest album covers of all time.

In 2000, it was voted number 865 in Colin Larkin's All Time Top 1000 Albums.

== Background ==
Joe Jackson and his band, using money earned by Jackson from touring with the cabaret band Koffee 'n' Kream, began recording the album from autumn 1977 to spring 1978 in a studio in Portsmouth. However, after producer David Kershenbaum heard a demo tape from Jackson, he signed Jackson to A&M Records in 1978, after which Jackson and his band quickly re-recorded the album. This was then followed by a tour to promote the record.

Look Sharp! was heavily influenced by reggae music, which, in a June 1979 interview, Jackson said he was "totally immersed in". Jackson also sought to capture a spontaneous feel on the album; he reflected at the time, "A lot of the tracks are first takes and there are no overdubs, though we think now it is a bit thin. We wanted a bit more live band sort of sound. In retrospect you always feel there's something you can improve on. Next time 'round we'll feature the guitar a bit more".

Jackson later spoke negatively of "Pretty Girls", saying, "It's all about pretty girls walking down the street and, Oh wow, isn't that a turn-on. In retrospect, it's kind of a stinker. It's embarrassing—ogling girls, I mean, that's kind of lame. It's just childish and silly and derivative, but I was 22 when I wrote it. Not everyone can be a prodigy!"

== Release ==
"Is She Really Going Out with Him?" was released as a single in the UK prior to the release of Look Sharp!, but it, as well as follow-ups "Sunday Papers" and "One More Time," failed to make an impact on the charts. Look Sharp! also stalled upon its initial release, but upon the re-release of "Is She Really Going Out with Him?" in Britain (as well as a single release in the US), the album grew in popularity, reaching #20 in North America. After the performance of the first album, the band quickly recorded a follow-up, I'm the Man, which has been described by Jackson as "Part Two of Look Sharp!" since its release. The album was particularly well-received in Canada where it reached #20 in July and November and was certified platinum by November 1979.

== Artwork ==
The photo used on the album's cover was shot by Brian Griffin on London's South Bank, near London Waterloo station. Upon arriving at the South Bank, Griffin noticed a shaft of light landing on the ground and asked Jackson to stand there: the whole process took no more than five minutes. According to Griffin, Jackson hated the record sleeve as it did not include his face, and vowed never to work with Griffin again. Nonetheless, the album artwork became one of the nominees for the 1980 Grammy Award for Best Recording Package.

Some observers didn't understand the tongue-in-cheek nature of Jackson's choice of title and cover art—an early reviewer in New Musical Express said they "suggest an obsession with style" and sniffed that Jackson sported "a pair of white side-lace Denson winklepickers that are, unfortunately, not nearly as cool as he evidently thinks they are". As time went on, journalists became more familiar with his youthful lack of interest in fashion, and The Face noted how most agreed with the general summation of him as a "sartorial disaster area".

== Critical reception ==
Professional ratings
Review scores
Source	Rating
AllMusic	5/5 stars
Encyclopedia of Popular Music	4/5 stars
Rolling Stone	5/5 stars
The Rolling Stone Album Guide	4.5/5 stars
Smash Hits	7/10
The Village Voice	B

Look Sharp! has seen critical acclaim since its release. In a five star review, Rolling Stone compared the album to the best works of Jackson's contemporary Elvis Costello, commenting, "Though Jackson would never achieve Costello's cachet, his early work holds up alongside that of his rival." John Rockwell in The New York Times picked it as the ninth best album of that year, stating that it was "Power pop at its refreshing best." In a later review, Allmusic was similarly complimentary, stating, "Look Sharp! is the sound of a young man searching for substance in a superficial world -- and it also happens to rock like hell." Paste named Look Sharp! the 17th best new wave album, with staff writer Mark Lore stating that it "ranks right up there with early records from another brainy, pissed-off songwriter called Elvis Costello, bursting with frustration and spazzy pop songs".

Jackson's own opinion on the album was mixed, with the artist later claiming that I'm the Man and 2003's Volume 4 were better albums overall. He later said on his website,

What can anyone say about something they did so long ago?! I'm not embarrassed by it, or not by most of it, anyway. It positively reeks of London 1978–79 and, well, it is what it is. I'm glad people liked it, and still like it, though I think some of that is nostalgia and a tendency to romanticise people's first albums, as though later ones must somehow be less 'authentic'. For a first album, this one's not bad, but I was only 23 when I made it and it would be pretty weird if I didn't think I'd done better things since.

== Alternative releases ==
Look Sharp! was re-released in 2001 in a 96K/24-bit remaster by Erick Labson and featured two bonus tracks, "Don't Ask Me" and "You Got the Fever", the respective B-sides of the singles "One More Time" and "Is She Really Going Out with Him?", originally released in May 1979 and October 1978. In addition to the standard 12-inch vinyl release, the record was also released in a special package on two 10-inch discs that also included a Look Sharp! badge.

== Track listing ==
All songs written and arranged by Joe Jackson. Produced by David Kershenbaum.

No.	Title	Length
1.	"One More Time"	3:15
2.	"Sunday Papers"	4:22
3.	"Is She Really Going Out with Him?"	3:33
4.	"Happy Loving Couples"	3:08
5.	"Throw It Away"	2:49
6.	"Baby Stick Around"	2:36
7.	"Look Sharp!"	3:23
8.	"Fools in Love"	4:23
9.	"(Do the) Instant Mash"	3:12
10.	"Pretty Girls"	2:55
11.	"Got the Time"	2:52

2001 reissue bonus tracks
No.	Title	Length
12.	"Don't Ask Me" (original B-side to "One More Time")	2:43
13.	"You Got the Fever" (original B-side to "Is She Really Going Out with Him?")	3:36

== Personnel ==
Musicians

- Joe Jackson – vocals, piano, harmonica
- Gary Sanford – guitar
- Graham Maby – bass
- David Houghton – drums

Production

- Joe Jackson – arrangements
- David Kershenbaum – producer
- Rod Hewison – recording engineer
- Aldo Bocca – assistant recording engineer
- Michael Ross – artwork
- Brian Griffin – photography (of Denson winklepickers)

== Charts ==
Album

Chart (1979)	Peak position
Australia (Kent Music Report)	20
Canada (RPM	20
Dutch Albums (Album Top 100)	36
New Zealand Albums (RMNZ)	13
UK Albums (Official Charts)	40
US Billboard 200	20

Singles

Year	Song	Chart	Position
1979	"Is She Really Going Out with Him?"	UK Singles Chart	#13
1979	"Is She Really Going Out with Him?"	Canada RPM	#9
1979	"Is She Really Going Out with Him?"	U.S. Billboard Hot 100	#21
1979	"Is She Really Going Out with Him?"	CMJ College Radio Tracks	#2
1979	"Got the Time"	CMJ College Radio Tracks	#11
1979	"Look Sharp!"	CMJ College Radio Tracks	#17
1979	"Fools in Love"	CMJ College Radio Tracks	#9
1979	"Sunday Papers"	CMJ College Radio Tracks	#20

== Sales and certifications ==
Certifications for Look Sharp!
Region	Certification	Certified units/sales
Netherlands (NVPI)	Gold	50,000^{^}
United States (RIAA)	Gold	500,000^{^}
^{^} Shipments figures based on certification alone.
