= Sunday Papers =

Single by Joe Jackson

from the album Look Sharp!
- B-side: "Look Sharp!"
- Released: February 1979
- Recorded: 1978
- Genre: New wave; ska
- Length: 4:22
- Label: A&M - AMS 7413
- Songwriter: Joe Jackson
- Producer: David Kershenbaum

Joe Jackson singles chronology
"Is She Really Going Out with Him?" (1978)	"Sunday Papers" (1979)	"One More Time" (1979)

"Sunday Papers" is a song written and performed by British new wave musician Joe Jackson. It was released on his debut album, Look Sharp!. Written as a critique of the British press, "Sunday Papers" features mocking lyrics and reggae-inspired music.

"Sunday Papers" was released as a single in the UK as the follow-up to his single, "Is She Really Going Out with Him?", but did not chart. Despite this, the song has generally received positive critical reception.

== Background ==
"Sunday Papers" was written by Jackson as a critique of the British tabloid press. In the lyrics, Jackson, a vocal opponent of the press, sings of the trashy and inaccurate stories printed by the papers. He recalled, "An image that came into my mind was, like, if someone just more or less lived on a diet of these kind of papers, that they might turn into a complete idiot". Jackson later described the song as an example of the "sarcastic flavor" his lyrics had at the time.

On stage, Jackson would often bring out a newspaper prior to performing the song, which he would read the headlines and stories in a sarcastic manner. He would also mockingly talk about the papers in general, sardonically calling the British papers "a sophisticated standard of journalism" in one performance. As Jackson performed the song, he would gradually rip the paper he showed the audience to pieces.

When a British newspaper, News of the World, became involved in a phone scandal, Jackson was asked whether the lyrics to "Sunday Papers" were prophetic. He replied:

"I don't know that [it] was. I think that what applied now applied then. I think that some of the worst people just got busted, that's all. All that stuff with the News of the World, I think it was business as usual. There are certain publications in the UK that have gone down market, that have gotten trashier. And there are some that are still at least trying to maintain a certain dignity. But yeah, I'm not a big fan of the UK media in general."

Jackson later reflected that he personally did not experience the brunt of the tabloid press; he explained, "I don't think I've ever been a big enough star ... to be a victim of the tabloids. I just think they're not really interested in me to that extent".

== Music ==
Musically, "Sunday Papers" originated when Jackson took a rhythm-and-blues riff and played it with reggae syncopation. Jackson then added the bass part.

"Sunday Papers" features influence from reggae and ska. Tom Magginnis of AllMusic wrote in a review of the song, "Rhythmically, the track ventures from the mostly straight ahead rock found on the album, playing with Reggae-like counter accents within a new wave context, something that had come into vogue, particularly with the success of the Police, which effectively gives the tracks slow tempo a funky rock feel". The song ends with a faster, louder section, which Magginnis described as "a sort of mock gospel rave up, [with] the band kicking into double time to shouts of 'Read all about it!'".

== Release and reception ==
In addition to its release on the Look Sharp! album, "Sunday Papers" saw single release in the UK and Germany in early 1979. The B-side for the single was "Look Sharp!" in both countries. The single failed to enter the UK Singles Chart, but reached No. 100 on the Record Business Singles Chart. It was followed in the UK by "One More Time," another Look Sharp! single.

"Sunday Papers" has generally received positive feedback from critics. AllMusic's Tom Maginnis stated that the song "proved that the success of the novelty hit 'Is She Really Going Out With Him' was not a fluke," and went on to say that "[a]s engaging as Jackson’s lyrics are, the music refuses to be overlooked as the rhythm section of Graham Maby (bass) and Dave Houghton (drums) groove with a precise swing that exudes a playful confidence while Jackson contributes a well placed harmonica solo before the last surging call and response chorus that has the band shouting 'Sunday papers!' to Jackson’s sharp accusations". Another AllMusic writer, Steve Huey, said that the song "deal[s] with the lack of thoughtful reflection in everyday life". An author for Billboard called the song a "classic".

Music critic Robert Christgau was more critical, saying that the track "inspires fond memories of 'Pleasant Valley Sunday'".

== Charts ==
Chart (1979)	Peak position
CMJ College Radio Tracks	20
UK The Singles Chart (Record Business)	100
