= Graham Maby =

English musical artist (born 1952)

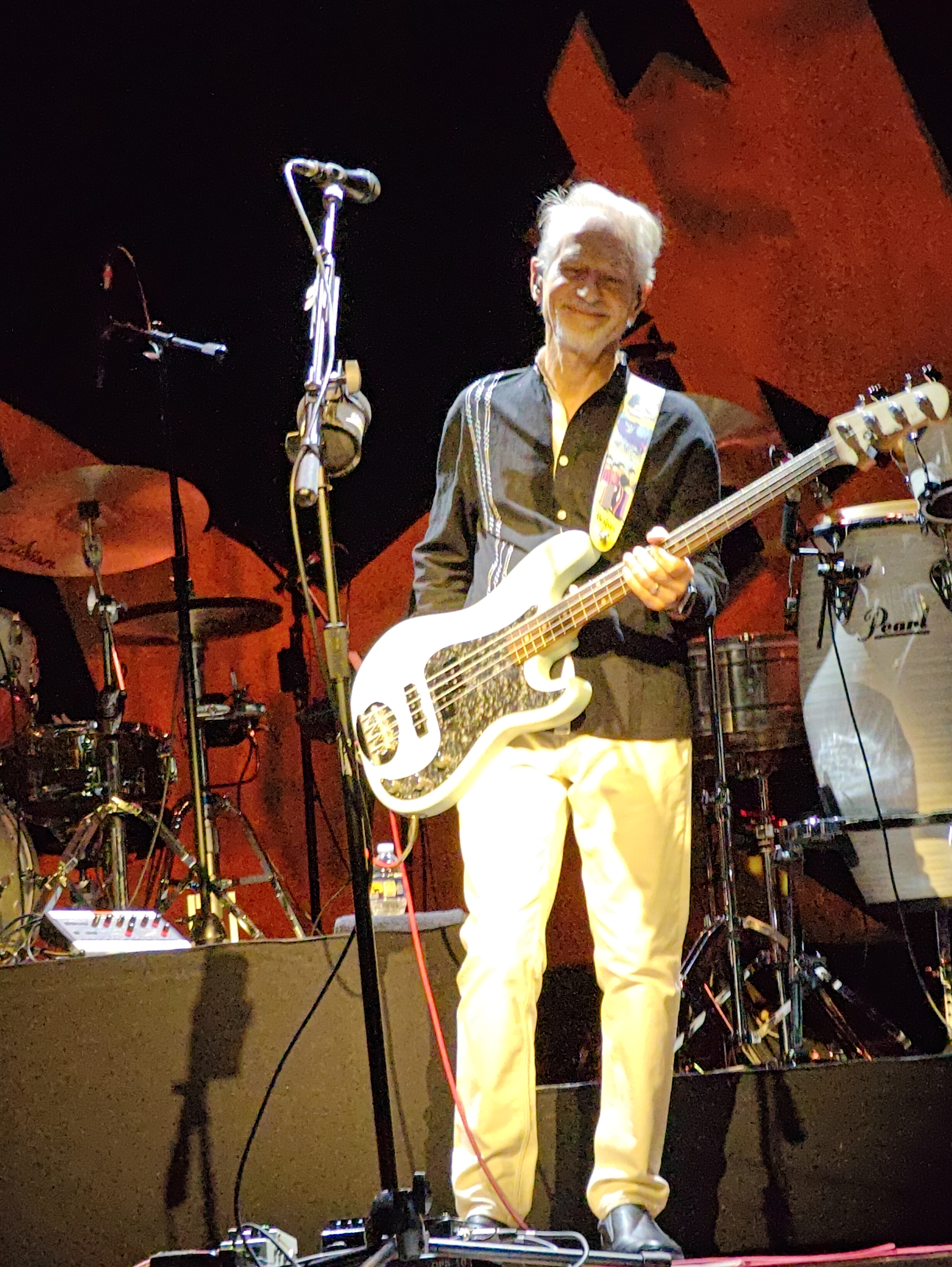

Background information
- Born: 1 September 1952 (age 74); Gosport, Hampshire, England
- Genres: Punk rock, new wave, pop, power pop, folk
- Occupations: Bassist, proofreader, producer
- Instruments: Vocals, bass
- Years active: 1978–present
- Labels: A&M, Virgin, Sony, Ryko

Graham Maby (born 1 September 1952) is an English bass guitar player. He has recorded and toured with Joe Jackson since his first album and appeared on most of Jackson's albums and tours.

== Personal life and career ==
Maby was born and raised in the central south coast town of Gosport. Working exclusively with Joe Jackson since the late 1970s, in the mid-1980s, he began working live and in the studio with Marshall Crenshaw. In the early 1990s, he toured with Graham Parker, Garland Jeffreys, the Silos, and Darden Smith. From 1995 to 1997, Maby played bass for They Might Be Giants. From 1998 to 2002, he recorded and toured with Natalie Merchant. Maby has also recorded and toured with Joan Baez, Freedy Johnston, Henry Lee Summer, Ian Hunter, Regina Spektor, Chris Stamey, Shivaree, and Dar Williams.

Along with playing bass, Maby also produced several tracks on Johnston's 1992 album, Can You Fly. He appeared in the 1986 movie Peggy Sue Got Married as a member of Marshall Crenshaw's band, and very briefly in the 2019 Todd Phillips movie Joker as a member of the "Murray Franklin Show" band.

His first-born son Christopher, a musician and actor, died in 1998.

== Discography ==
=== With Joe Jackson ===
Year	Title
1979	Look Sharp!
1979	I'm the Man
1980	Beat Crazy
1981	Jumpin' Jive
1982	Night and Day
1983	Mike's Murder
1984	Body and Soul
1988	Live 1980/86
1989	Blaze of Glory
1991	Laughter & Lust
1994	Night Music
2000	Summer in the City: Live in New York
2000	Night and Day II
2003	Volume 4
2004	Afterlife
2008	Rain
2011	Live Music - Europe 2010
2012	Live at Rockpalast
2015	Fast Forward ("New York" section)
2019	Fool
2026	Hope and Fury

=== With They Might Be Giants ===
Year	Title
1993	Why Does the Sun Shine?
1994	Back to Skull
1994	John Henry
1996	Factory Showroom
1998	Severe Tire Damage
1999	Long Tall Weekend
2000	Working Undercover for the Man

=== With Natalie Merchant ===
Year	Title
1998	Ophelia
1999	Live in Concert
2001	Motherland
2003	The House Carpenter's Daughter

=== With Freedy Johnston ===
Year	Title
1992	Can You Fly
1993	Unlucky
1994	This Perfect World
1997	Never Home
2001	Right Between the Promises

=== With Marshall Crenshaw ===
Year	Title
1987	Mary Jean & 9 Others
1989	Good Evening
1994	Live ...My Truck Is My Home
2003	What's in the Bag?

=== With Ian Hunter ===
Year	Title
2007	Shrunken Heads

=== With Joan Baez ===
Year	Title
2005	Bowery Songs

=== With Dar Williams ===
Year	Title
2000	The Green World

=== With Regina Spektor ===
Year	Title
2003	Soviet Kitsch

=== With Chris Stamey ===
Year	Title
1987	It's Alright
1991	Fireworks

=== With Darden Smith ===
Year	Title
1993	Little Victories
1996	Deep Fantastic Blue

=== With Henry Lee Summer ===
Year	Title
1988	Henry Lee Summer
1989	I've Got Everything

=== With Nina Hagen ===
Year	Title
2011	Volksbeat
