= Joe Jackson (musician) =

English musician (born 1954)

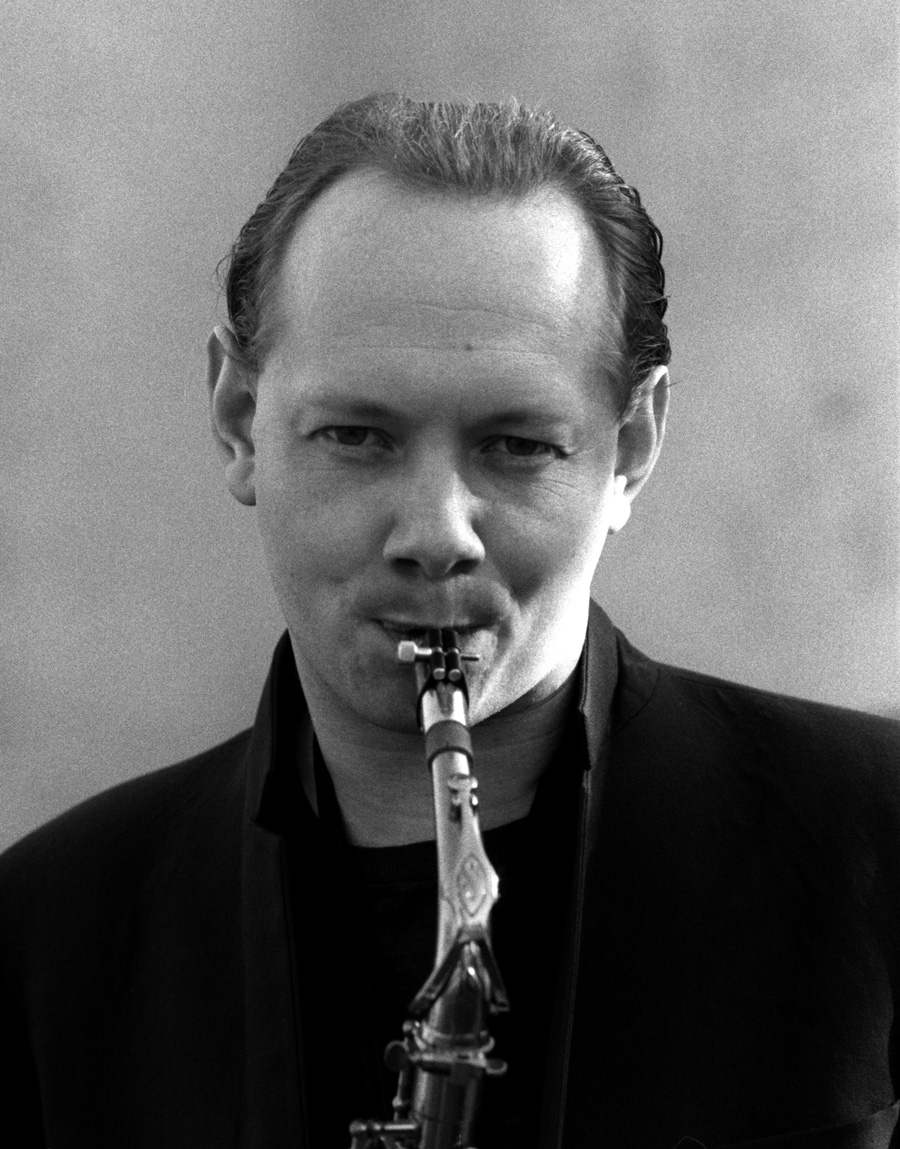
- Jackson performing in 1982

Background information
- Born: David Ian Jackson; 11 August 1954 (age 72); Burton upon Trent, Staffordshire, England
- Origin: Portsmouth, Hampshire, England
- Genres: Rock; pop; new wave; jazz; classical
- Occupations: Musician; singer; songwriter
- Instruments: Vocals; keyboards; saxophone
- Years active: 1970–present
- Labels: A&M; Sony Classical; Virgin; EMI; Rykodisc; E1; Koch
- Website: joejackson.com

Joe Jackson (born David Ian Jackson; 11 August 1954) is a British musician, singer and songwriter. Having spent years studying music and playing clubs, he found success as part of the late 1970s new wave scene with hit singles "Is She Really Going Out with Him?" from his first album Look Sharp! (1979) and "It's Different for Girls" from second album I'm the Man (1979). In the 1980s, he moved to a more jazz-pop style, and achieved further hits including "Steppin' Out" from the album Night and Day (1982) and "You Can't Get What You Want (Till You Know What You Want)" from the album Body and Soul (1984). During this period, Jackson became associated with the 1980s Second British Invasion of the US. He has also composed classical music and has received five Grammy Award nominations.

== Early life, family and education ==
Born David Ian Jackson in Burton upon Trent, Staffordshire, England, he spent his first year in nearby Swadlincote, Derbyshire. He was raised in the Paulsgrove area of Portsmouth, where he attended Portsmouth Technical High School. At age 11, he began learning to play the violin, but after a couple of years he switched to the piano, and convinced his father to purchase one for their Paulsgrove council house. Jackson and his parents moved to nearby Gosport when he was a teenager. Jackson began playing piano in bars when he was 16. He won a scholarship at age 18 to study musical composition at London's Royal Academy of Music, where his composition teacher was Richard Stoker.

== Career ==
Jackson's first band, Edward Bear, (Note: Not to be confused with the band of the same name, which disbanded in 1974.) later renamed Arms and Legs, released two unsuccessful singles, then dissolved in 1976. Still known as David Jackson during his time with the band, he picked up the nickname "Joe" based on his perceived resemblance to the British television puppet character Joe 90, a genius child spy. Jackson then spent some time performing on the cabaret circuit to make money to record a demo.

=== Joe Jackson Band ===
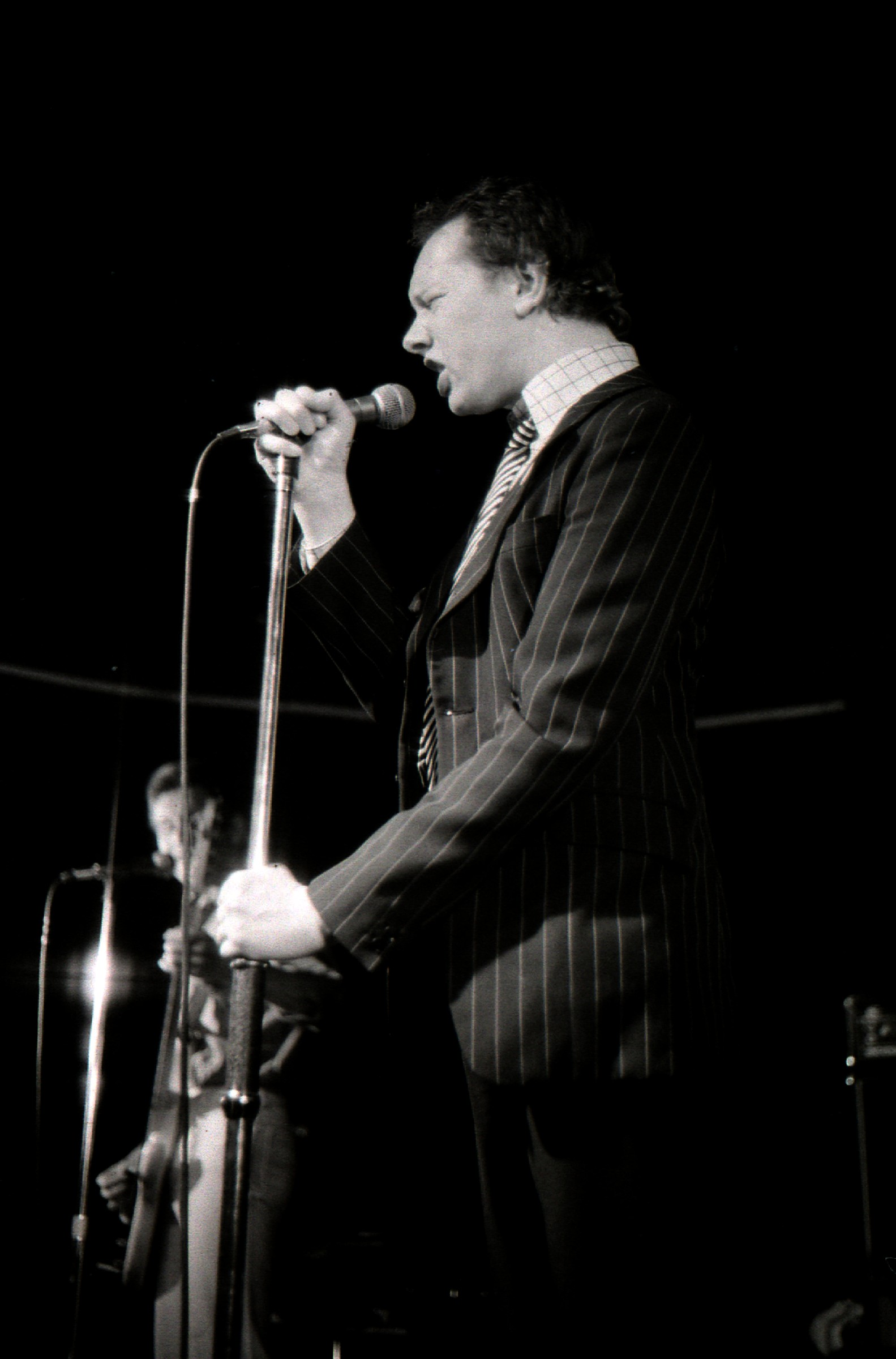
Jackson at El Mocambo, Toronto, 21 May 1979

In 1978, a record producer heard Jackson's demo tape and signed him to A&M Records. The next year, the newly formed Joe Jackson Band released Look Sharp!, their debut album. The band consisted of Jackson, Gary Sanford on guitar, Graham Maby on bass, and David Houghton on drums. A mix of rock, melodic jazz, and new wave, it mined a vein similar to contemporaries Elvis Costello and Graham Parker. The album enjoyed wide critical success: in 2013, Rolling Stone magazine named Look Sharp! No. 98 in a list of the 100 best debut albums of all time. Some commercial success also followed, as the debut single "Is She Really Going Out with Him?" reached the top 40 in five countries, and No. 9 in Canada.

The Joe Jackson Band released I'm the Man in 1979. The album followed a similar musical pattern; further, it received good, though not as strong, reviews. It did produce the single "It's Different for Girls", which became Jackson's highest charting UK single, peaking at No. 5. Beat Crazy followed in 1980. That same year, Jackson on keyboards backed Lincoln Thompson in a reggae crossover album titled Natural Wild, with Jackson and his band billed as the Rasses, playing behind Thompson's vocals.

The Joe Jackson Band toured extensively until it broke up at the end of 1980; Houghton, weary of touring and fame, left the band that year. Although Maby continued to work with Jackson in the following decades, the full band would not reunite until 2004's Volume 4.

=== Change in style ===
In 1981, Jackson produced an album for the British power pop group the Keys. The Keys Album was the group's only LP.

After the Joe Jackson Band disbanded, Jackson recorded Jumpin' Jive, an album of old-style swing and blues tunes. It included songs by Cab Calloway, Lester Young, Glenn Miller, and Louis Jordan. The album and associated single release were credited to "Joe Jackson's Jumpin' Jive".

Jackson's 1982 album, Night and Day, was his only studio album to chart in the UK and US Top 10, peaking at No. 3 (UK) and at No. 4 (US). Two singles released from the album, "Steppin' Out" and "Breaking Us in Two", were US top 20 hits. The tracks "Real Men" and "A Slow Song" referred obliquely to New York City's early 1980s gay culture, critiquing its exclusiveness and asking for a slow song in the disco respectively. "Real Men" also became a top 10 hit in Australia.

By 1984, New York had become Jackson's home base. He recorded Body and Soul there, an album he later said was "from the point of view of a relative newcomer". Heavily influenced by pop, jazz standards and salsa, it had the US No. 15 hit single "You Can't Get What You Want (Till You Know What You Want)".

In 1985, Jackson played piano on Joan Armatrading's album Secret Secrets, including the single "Love by You", and in 1986 he collaborated with Suzanne Vega on the single "Left of Center" from Pretty in Pink's soundtrack. Jackson's next album was Big World, with all-new songs recorded live in front of an audience instructed to remain silent while music was playing. Released in 1986, it was a three-sided double record; the fourth side consisted of a single centering groove and a label stating "there is no music on this side".

The instrumental album Will Power (1987), with heavy classical and jazz influences, set the stage for things to come later, but before Jackson left pop behind, he released two more albums, Blaze of Glory (which he performed in its entirety during the subsequent tour) and Laughter & Lust. He composed, produced, and performed the music for the 1992 film I'm Your Man, touted as the first interactive movie; audiences would vote on the direction the movie would follow at select points. Explaining why he became interested in the project, Jackson said, "I think whenever you get an opportunity to be involved in something new, you might as well be in on it, even if it sort of goes the way of 3-D glasses and Odorama, or whatever." In 1995, Jackson contributed his version of "Statue of Liberty" on A Testimonial Dinner: The Songs of XTC, a tribute album for the English band XTC.

=== Post-pop ===
In the late 1990s, Jackson expanded into classical music; he signed with Sony Classical in 1997 and released Symphony No. 1 in 1999, for which he received a Grammy for Best Pop Instrumental Album in 2001. In 2000, he released a follow-up album, Night and Day II. The album featured contributions by Graham Maby (bass), Sue Hadjopoulos (percussion), the string quartet Ethel, and three guest vocalists: Sussan Deyhim, Dale De Vere and Marianne Faithfull.

In 2003, he reunited his original quartet for the album Volume 4, and a lengthy tour. In 2004, he contributed vocals to a cover of Pulp's "Common People" with William Shatner for Shatner's album Has Been (produced by Ben Folds). In 2005, he teamed up with Todd Rundgren and the string quartet Ethel for a tour of the US and Europe. A dedicated smoker, he gave up his New York apartment in 2006 partly in protest over the ascendancy of smoking bans, and made the Berlin neighbourhood Kreuzberg his new home. It was there that he recorded, with longtime collaborators Graham Maby and Dave Houghton, his eighteenth studio album, Rain (Rykodisc, January 2008); the album was followed by a five-month tour.

In 2015, Jackson announced the completion of his follow-up to 2012's The Duke via his official website. The album's title, Fast Forward, and track list were confirmed in addition to North American tour dates. The titular first single was released for streaming via his official SoundCloud page. The entire record was briefly posted before being taken down a day later.

On 18 January 2019, Jackson released the album Fool. Jackson said about the album on his website: "One of my inspirations for this album was the band I've been touring with on and off for the last 3 years. I've had many different line-ups but this one is special." Jackson and the band performed "Fabulously Absolute" on The Tonight Show on 21 January 2019. Fool debuted in the top 20 album charts in Holland, Belgium, Germany and Switzerland. In the US, it debuted at No. 25 on Billboard's Top Album Sales Chart. In the UK, it entered the Indie Albums Chart at No. 13.

What a Racket!, also known as Mr. Joe Jackson Presents Max Champion in 'What a Racket!', was released by earMUSIC on 24 November 2023; it is his 21st studio album. The shows supporting the album featured Joe solo in the first set and the full Max album in the second, with Joe accompanied by a large band.

In April 2026, Jackson released his first new rock album in seven years, Hope and Fury. It was preceded by the singles "Welcome To Burning-by-Sea", "Fabulous People" and "After All This Time". A lengthy tour was planned for 2026, starting in May. His website noted: "Though often depicted as a chameleonic artist who constantly 'changes his style,' Jackson insists that most of his albums are in 'his own mainstream' — collections of sophisticated pop songs, using different kinds of rhythms and combinations of instruments." Hope And Fury "...might strike a fan as a cross between 2019's Fool, 1991's Laughter and Lust, and 1982's Night and Day." For the recording Jackson "assembled his on-and-off band since 2016 — 'bassist for life' Graham Maby, guitarist Teddy Kumpel, and drummer Doug Yowell — augmented by the Latin percussion of Peruvian native Paulo Stagnaro."

== Other activities ==
Jackson has actively campaigned against smoking bans in both the UK and the US, publishing a 2005 pamphlet, The Smoking Issue, and a 2007 essay, Smoke, Lies and the Nanny State. He also recorded a satirical song ("In 20-0-3") on the subject.

Jackson's 1999 autobiography, A Cure for Gravity, was described by him as a "book about music, thinly disguised as a memoir". It traces his working-class upbringing in Portsmouth and charts his musical life from childhood until his 24th birthday. According to Jackson, life as a pop star was hardly worth writing about.

Jackson has appeared in one film, a cameo in 2005's The Greatest Game Ever Played, where Jackson is briefly shown and heard performing the song "Hello! Hello! Who's Your Lady Friend?" in a raucous early 1900s English pub. Jackson initially had been contacted to compose the film's score, but the studio instead hired Brian Tyler. However, one track in the film — "Angel," performed by soprano Dawn Upshaw — is still credited to Jackson.

== Legacy ==
In 2004 the first-ever tribute album to Jackson, Different for Girls: Women Artists and Female-Fronted Bands Cover Joe Jackson, was released. Among the female artists covering Jackson was Joy Askew, whose album credits include Jackson's Big World, Live 1980/86, Blaze of Glory, Laughter & Lust and Heaven & Hell. A brief presentation of the album indicated: "Mr. Jackson himself has said: "I LOVE the idea of an all-female tribute album! Let them know I can't wait to hear it."

== Personal life ==
Jackson legally changed his first name to Joe at age 20.

Jackson spent several years living in New York City, which served as inspiration for his 1982 song "Steppin' Out". In a 2018 interview, Jackson said "I don't like New York much these days. It's as if the city and I had a hot love affair and now we're just friends, but we still have to see each other to remain friends. Today I live in Berlin. The New York I knew in late '81 and '82 is gone." Jackson resides in Berlin but also owns homes in New York and Portsmouth.

Jackson and his wife Ruth divorced after two years; he later called the marriage a "disaster". Jackson discussed his bisexuality in his memoir, A Cure for Gravity, writing: "Sex seemed to me, and to a great extent still seems, an ocean of mysteries. In that ocean, I was a plankton that could have as easily been straight or gay, male or female, animal, vegetable, or mineral." His questioning of potential homosexuality and same-sex attraction is explored in the 1982 single "Real Men". In a 2001 interview with a journalist also named Joe Jackson, the Irish Independent, Jackson said he was in a relationship with a male partner.

== Discography ==
=== With original band ===
- Look Sharp! (1979)
- I'm the Man (1979)
- Beat Crazy (1980)
- Volume 4 (2003)
- Afterlife (2004)

=== Other albums ===
- Joe Jackson's Jumpin' Jive (1981)
- Night and Day (1982)
- Mike's Murder (1983)
- Body and Soul (1984)
- Big World (1986)
- Will Power (1987)
- Tucker (1988)
- Live 1980/86 (1988)
- Blaze of Glory (1989)
- Laughter & Lust (1991)
- Night Music (1994)
- Heaven & Hell (1997)
- Symphony No. 1 (1999)
- Night and Day II (2000)
- Two Rainy Nights (2002)
- Rain (2008)
- At the BBC (2009)
- Live Music - Europe 2010 (2011)
- Live at Rockpalast (2012)
- The Duke (2012)
- Fast Forward (2015)
- Fool (2019)
- What a Racket! (2023)
- Hope and Fury (2026)

== Bibliography ==
- A Cure for Gravity, 1999, autobiography ISBN 1-86230-083-6
