= Stepping Out: The Very Best of Joe Jackson =

Greatest hits album by Joe Jackson
- Released: 3 September 1990
- Genre: New wave, rock, pop
- Label: A&M Records
- Producer: Steve Jensen and Martin Kirkup

Joe Jackson chronology
Blaze of Glory (1989)	Stepping Out: The Very Best of Joe Jackson (1990)	Laughter & Lust (1991)

Professional ratings
Review scores
Source	Rating
AllMusic	4.5/5 stars

Stepping Out: The Very Best of Joe Jackson is a compilation album from the English musician Joe Jackson. The songs, arranged in chronological order, are taken from nine of his first twelve albums, all of which were released on the A&M Records label. Stepping Out: The Very Best of Joe Jackson reached No. 7 in the UK Albums Chart in October 1990. By this time Jackson had parted company with A&M, with his next few releases being on the Virgin Records label.

In his book, The Great Rock Discography, music historian Martin C. Strong awards the album 8 out of 10.

== Track listing ==
No.	Title	Album	Length
1.	"Is She Really Going Out with Him?"	Look Sharp! (1979)	3:33
2.	"Fools in Love"	Look Sharp!	4:23
3.	"I'm the Man"	I'm the Man (1979)	3:58
4.	"It's Different for Girls"	I'm the Man	3:42
5.	"Beat Crazy"	Beat Crazy (1980)	4:15
6.	"Jumpin' Jive"	Jumpin' Jive (1981)	2:41
7.	"Breaking Us in Two"	Night and Day (1982)	4:53
8.	"Steppin' Out"	Night and Day	4:23
9.	"A Slow Song" (live album version)	Live 1980/86 (1988)	7:45
10.	"You Can't Get What You Want (Till You Know What You Want)"	Body & Soul (1984)	4:50
11.	"Be My Number Two"	Body & Soul	4:18
12.	"Right and Wrong"	Big World (1986)	4:35
13.	"Home Town"	Big World	3:12
14.	"Down to London"	Blaze of Glory (1989)	4:14
15.	"Nineteen Forever"	Blaze of Glory	5:48

The LP release did not include the songs "Beat Crazy" and "Home Town". The Australian LP/CD/tape release omitted "Fools in Love" and inserted "Real Men" in its place, as that had been a #6 hit in Australia in 1982.

== Production and songwriting credits ==
Based on the track numbering from the CD version of the album, the songs were produced by: tracks 1, 2, 3 and 4 by David Kershenbaum; tracks 7, 8, 9, 10, 11, 12 and 13 by Joe Jackson and David Kershenbaum; tracks 5, 6, 14 and 15 by Joe Jackson.

All tracks were written by Joe Jackson, except for "Jumpin' Jive", penned in 1939 by Cab Calloway, Frank Froeba and Jack Palmer.

Photography by Janette Beckman.

== Charts ==
Chart (1990)	Peak position
Australian Albums (ARIA)	13
Dutch Albums (Album Top 100)	45
German Albums (Offizielle Top 100)	78
UK Albums (OCC)	7
