= Laughter & Lust Live =

- Directed by: Maurice Todman
- Produced by: Philip Dreamer
- Starring: Joe Jackson
- Music by: Joe Jackson
- Distributed by: Warner Music Vision (Europe); A*Vision Entertainment (US)
- Release date: 1992
- Running time: 75 min

Laughter & Lust Live is a live concert video by the British singer-songwriter and musician Joe Jackson, which was released on VHS and LaserDisc by Warner Music Vision in 1992. Laughter & Lust Live was filmed on 20 September 1991 at the State Theatre in Sydney. It was the final concert of Jackson's world tour promoting his album Laughter & Lust. In September 1992, the concert first aired on UK television on the BBC One channel.

== Critical reception ==
On its release, Brenda Herrmann of the Chicago Tribune considered the video to "show the perfectionist performer at his best - simply giving one heck of a show". She praised the "extremely able backup band" but was critical of the "mundane lighting" and the director's "frequent focus" on Mindy Jostyn. Herrmann concluded: "Jackson's commitment to sparking sound production and his fine songs provide great video entertainment".

== Track listing ==
1. "Steppin' Out"
2. "It's Different for Girls"
3. "Got the Time"
4. "Obvious Song"
5. "Hit Single"
6. "Another World"
7. "Look Sharp!"
8. "The Other Me"
9. "Real Men"
10. "Rant and Rave"
11. "Nineteen Forever"
12. "Oh Well"
13. "Jamie G."
14. "One More Time"
15. "Stranger than Fiction"
16. "I'm the Man"
17. "A Slow Song"

== Personnel ==
Joe Jackson's Band

- Joe Jackson - vocals, keyboards
- Ed Roynesdal - keyboards, violin
- Graham Maby - bass, vocals
- Tom Teeley - guitar, vocals, piano
- Sue Hadjopoulos - percussion, vocals
- Dan Hickey - drums
- Mindy Jostyn - vocals, guitar, harmonica, violin

Production

- Maurice Todman - director
- Philip Dreamer - producer
- Peter C. Skillman - executive in charge of production
- Steven Jensen, Martin Kirkup, Frankie Enfield, Libby Wilson, Joe Jackson - executive producers
