= Mirror Stars =

Studio album by Fabulous Poodles
- Released: December 1978
- Recorded: Ramport Studios, London, 1977; Basing Street, London, 1978
- Genre: Rock
- Label: Epic
- Producer: John Entwistle; Muff Winwood; Fabulous Poodles; Howard Kilgour

Fabulous Poodles chronology
Mirror Stars (1978)	Think Pink (1979)

Professional ratings
Review scores
Source	Rating
Dave Marsh	4/5 stars
Christgau's Record Guide	C
Rolling Stone	Favourable

Mirror Stars is the first American album by the Fabulous Poodles. The album was a reconfigured version of their second British album Unsuitable with four tracks added from their debut album Fabulous Poodles. The album was well received by American critics and reached No. 61 in the Billboard 200 album chart in 1979.

== Track listing ==
All songs written by Tony De Meur and John Parsons except where noted.

Side one:

1. "Mirror Star" – 4:27
2. "Work Shy" – 3:30
3. "Chicago Boxcar" – 3:56 (De Meur, Parsons, Jonathan Bentley, Robert Suffolk)
4. "Oh Cheryl" – 3:25
5. "Toytown People" – 2:10

Side two:

1. "Mr. Mike" – 3:38
2. "Roll Your Own" – 2:46 (Mel McDaniel)
3. "B Movies" – 3:18
4. "Tit Photographer Blues" – 2:48 (Jay Myrdal, De Meur, Parsons)
5. "Cherchez la Femme" – 3:38

"Work Shy", "Mr. Mike", "Roll Your Own" and "Cherchez la Femme" were recorded in June 1977 and were produced by John Entwistle.

== Personnel ==
- Tony De Meur – lead vocals, guitars, electric sitar, harmonica
- Richie C. Robertson – bass, guitar, keyboards, percussion, backing vocals
- Bobby Valentino – violin, mandolin, backing vocals
- Bryn Burrows – drums, percussion, backing vocals
- John Entwistle – bass on "Mr. Mike" and "Cherchez la Femme"
