= Summer in the City: Live in New York =

Live album by Joe Jackson
- Released: 16 May 2000
- Recorded: August 1999
- Genre: Rock
- Length: 54:59
- Label: Sony Music
- Producer: Joe Jackson and Sheldon Steiger

Joe Jackson chronology
Symphony No. 1 (1999)	Summer in the City: Live in New York (2000)	Night and Day II (2000)

Professional ratings
Review scores
Source	Rating
AllMusic	4.5/5 stars

Summer in the City: Live in New York is a live album by English musician, singer and songwriter Joe Jackson with Graham Maby and Gary Burke. The album was produced by Jackson and Sheldon Steiger.

With semi-classical pieces on his previous three recordings, Jackson proved he had not abandoned pop altogether in June 2000, with this issue, an album drawn from an August 1999 concert. It featured Jackson playing the piano and singing, backed only by bassist Maby and drummer Burke, performing some of his old songs and several covers.

The shows were recorded by Steve Remote and Sheldon Steiger over three days in August 1999 at Joe's Pub in Manhattan.

== Track listing ==
All songs written and arranged by Joe Jackson, except where noted.

No.	Title	Writer(s)	Length
1.	"Summer in the City"	Mark Sebastian, Steve Boone	1:47
2.	"Obvious Song"		4:25
3.	"Another World"		5:02
4.	"Fools in Love/For Your Love medley"	"For Your Love" by Graham Gouldman	6:36
5.	"Mood Indigo"	music: Duke Ellington; Barney Bigard; lyrics: Irving Mills	4:24
6.	"The 'In' Crowd/Down to London medley"	The 'In' Crowd" by Bill Page	7:26
7.	"Eleanor Rigby"	John Lennon, Paul McCartney	3:13
8.	"Be My Number Two"		3:23
9.	"Home Town"		3:59
10.	"It's Different for Girls"		4:02
11.	"King of the World"	Donald Fagen, Walter Becker	3:45
12.	"You Can't Get What You Want (Till You Know What You Want)"		3:30
13.	"One More Time"		3:35

== Personnel ==
Musicians

- Joe Jackson - piano, vocals
- Graham Maby – bass, vocals
- Gary Burke – drums

Production

- Joe Jackson - arrangements, producer
- Sheldon Steiger - co-producer, recording engineer
- Dan Gellert - associate producer, engineer
- Steve Remote - recording engineer
- Sean Harkness - assistant recording engineer
- Ted Jensen - mastering engineer
- Charlie Post - mixing engineer
- P.R. Brown - art direction
- Caroline McNamara - photography
