= Back on the Train =

Back on the Train may refer to:

- Back on the Train, album by Electric Bluebirds and Bobby Valentino (British musician) 1996
- "Back on the Train", song by Phish, Marshall and Antonio from Farmhouse (album)
- "Back On the Train" by Toots & the Maytals
- "Put Me on a Train Back to Texas" by Waylon Jennings / Willie Nelson Composed by Billy "Bass" Nelson / Jim Hurt / Roy Clayborne
- Back on the Train Caroline Cotter 2008
