= Blaze of Glory (Joe Jackson album) =

Studio album by Joe Jackson
- Released: 17 April 1989
- Recorded: November–December 1988
- Studios: Bearsville (Woodstock, New York); RCA (New York City); Electric Lady (New York City)
- Genres: Rock; pop
- Length: 57:10
- Label: A&M
- Producer: Joe Jackson

Joe Jackson chronology
Tucker (1988)	Blaze of Glory (1989)	Stepping Out: The Very Best of Joe Jackson (1990)

Professional ratings
Review scores
Source	Rating
AllMusic	3/5 stars
New Musical Express	6/10
Q	5/5 stars
Record Mirror	4/5 stars
Rolling Stone	4/5 stars

Blaze of Glory is the tenth studio album by English rock musician Joe Jackson, released in 1989. Jackson has stated that the album and the songs themselves were an examination of his generation as the 1980s were ending, ranging from the optimism of the 1950s ("Tomorrow's World") to the politics of terrorism ("Rant and Rave") and the Cold War ("Evil Empire"), to yuppies ("Discipline") and rockers who are well past their prime ("Nineteen Forever"). The title track compares the legacy of a classic rock musician who died young ("...went out in a blaze of glory") with the current wannabes ("They're just cartoons" who "think they're Superman" but "can't even fly").

Although Blaze of Glory was a modest seller, the resultant single "Nineteen Forever" reached No. 4 in the US Hot Modern Rock Tracks chart. Jackson felt the album was one of his best efforts and toured to perform and support it with an eleven-piece band in the U.S. and Europe from June to November 1989, and was disappointed with both the critical and commercial reaction as well as his record label's lack of support.

== Critical reception ==
Upon its release, Nick Robinson of Music Week summarised, "By taking a reflective but by no means dated look at his past work, Jackson has come up with a definitive collection of musical styles and moods that flow gracefully – each one showing a different side to his songwriting character." Kevin Murphy of Record Mirror considered it to show Jackson "back to his adventurous and ambitious best" with a "diverse collection of moods that knit together to tell the story of his life from quizzical child to cynical adult". He added that the album is "typical Jackson – all jazz-tinged Sixties brass, string-swamped sentimentality and glimpses of pub rock theatrics – but done with a greater confidence and richness."

== Track listing ==
All songs written, arranged and produced by Joe Jackson.

No.	Title	Length
1.	"Tomorrow's World"	4:30
2.	"Me and You (Against the World)"	4:14
3.	"Down to London"	4:14
4.	"Sentimental Thing"	6:09
5.	"Acropolis Now"	4:21
6.	"Blaze of Glory"	6:02
7.	"Rant and Rave"	4:45
8.	"Nineteen Forever"	5:48
9.	"The Best I Can Do"	3:10
10.	"Evil Empire"	3:45
11.	"Discipline"	4:59
12.	"The Human Touch"	5:11

== Personnel ==
Musicians

- Joe Jackson - lead vocals (1, 2, 3, 6, 7, 8, 11, 12), organ (1), acoustic piano (2, 3, 5, 7, 9, 12), synth harmonica (3), synthesizers (4), synth solo (5), backing vocals (6, 8, 11), acoustic piano solo (7), harmony vocals (8), keyboards (11), all vocals (9, 10),
- Ed Roynesdal – synthesizer programming, sampling, Kurzweil K250 sequencer, drum programming, synthesizers (6, 8, 9), acoustic piano (7), vibraphone (7), Hammond organ (8), keyboards (11), violin (12)
- Tom Teeley – guitars (1, 2, 3, 5, 8), electric guitar (6), backing vocals (8, 11), acoustic guitar (10)
- Vinnie Zummo – 12-string guitar (1, 2), guitars (4, 11), acoustic guitar (5, 6, 10, 12), electric 12-string guitar (5), electric sitar (8), nylon guitar solo (10), nylon guitar (12)
- Graham Maby – bass (1, 2, 3, 6, 7, 8, 10, 12), lead vocals (1), backing vocals (8, 11)
- Rick Ford – bass (5, 11), 6-string fretless bass solo (9), fretless bass (10)
- Anthony Cox – acoustic bass (6)
- Gary Burke – Kurzweil drums (1, 2, 3, 6), drums (5, 7, 8, 10, 11)
- Sue Hadjopoulos – congas (7, 10)
- Tony Aiello – flute (1), tenor saxophone (2, 3, 6, 7, 8, 11), tenor sax solo (8), soprano saxophone (11)
- Steve Elson – alto saxophone (2), baritone saxophone (3, 7, 11)
- Chris Hunter – alto saxophone (2, 3, 6, 7, 8, 11)
- Charley Gordon – trombone (2, 3, 6, 7, 8, 11)
- Tony Barrero – trumpet (2, 3, 6, 7, 8, 11), second trumpet solo (7)
- Michael Morreale – trumpet (2, 3, 6–9, 11), first trumpet solo (7)
- Gene Orloff – string conductor (4)
- Glenn Dicterow – violin solo (4)
- Charles McCracken – cello (12)
- Joy Askew – lead vocals (1, 2, 3, 11), backing vocals (1, 4, 6, 7, 8, 11, 12)
- Drew Barfield – backing vocals (1, 7, 8, 11, 12), lead vocals (2, 4, 7, 11)

Production

- Joe Jackson – producer, arrangements, art direction
- Ed Roynesdal – associate producer
- Joe Barbaria – engineer, mixing
- Paul Goodman – string recording (4)
- Thom Cadley – recording assistant
- Bridget Daly – mix assistant
- Scott Hull – digital editing
- Bob Ludwig – mastering
- Masterdisk (New York City, New York) – editing and mastering location
- Richard Frankel – art direction
- Pat Gorman – art direction
- Frank Orlinsky – art direction
- Manhattan Design – design
- Sandra Haber – photography
- Laura Levine – band photography
- Martin Kirkup and Steve Jensen with Direct Management Group – management

== Charts ==
=== Weekly charts ===
Weekly chart performance for Blaze of Glory
Chart (1989)	Peak position
Australian Albums (ARIA)	31
Canada Top Albums/CDs (RPM)	43
Dutch Albums (Album Top 100)	12
European Albums (Music & Media)	36
German Albums (Offizielle Top 100)	27
Italian Albums (Musica e dischi)	20
Swiss Albums (Schweizer Hitparade)	22
UK Albums (Official Charts)	36
US Billboard 200	61
US Cash Box Top 200 Albums	59
US AOR Albums (Radio & Records)	12

=== Year-end charts ===
Year-end chart performance for Blaze of Glory
Chart (1989)	Position
Dutch Albums (Album Top 100)	85
