= Mitch Benn =

English comedian, author, and musician

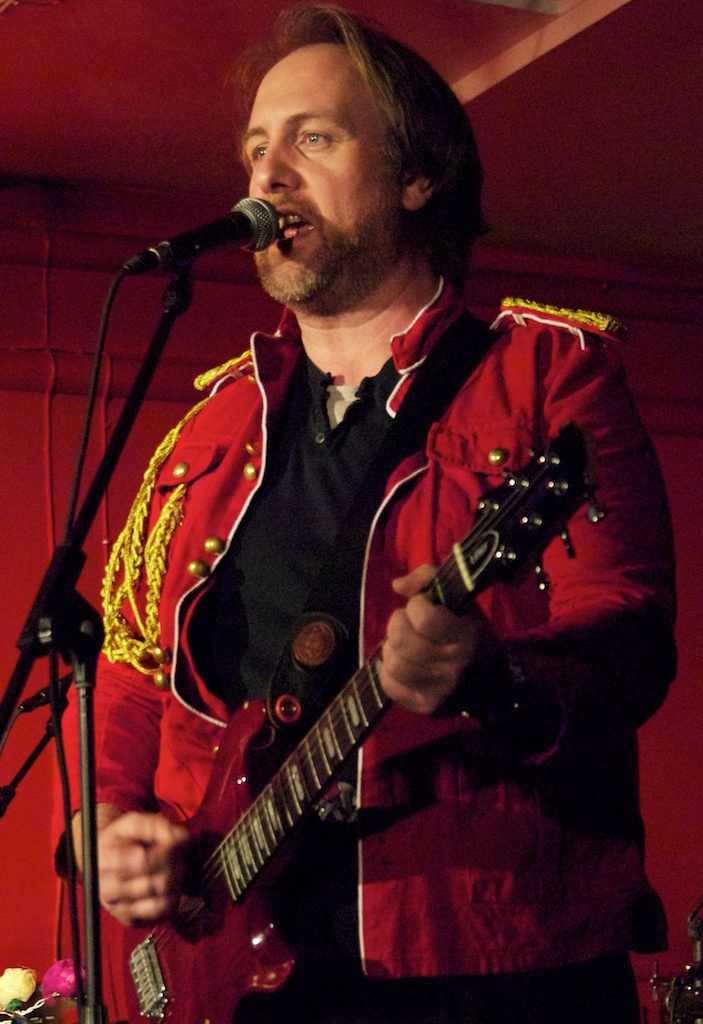
- Benn performing at the Distraction Club in London in 2013
- Born: Mitchell John Benn; 20 January 1970 (age 56); Liverpool, England
- Education: University of Edinburgh

Comedy career
- Years active: 1994–present
- Medium: Stand-up/singer
- Genres: Comedy rock comedy
- Mitch Benn's voice from the BBC programme Woman's Hour, 27 December 2011.
- Website: http://www.mitchbenn.com

Mitchell John Benn (born 20 January 1970) is an English comedian, author and musician known for his comedy rock songs performed on BBC Radio. He was, until 2016, a regular contributor to BBC Radio 4's satirical programme The Now Show, and has hosted other radio shows.

Benn has performed at several music festivals, including the first Latitude Festival, Bestival and was at Glastonbury for many years, and has performed at the Edinburgh Festival Fringe every available year since 2011. He has released eight studio albums and more than 130 online albums via Mitch Benn on Bandcamp. His first science fiction novel, entitled Terra, was published in July 2013 by Victor Gollancz. The follow up, Terra's World was published by Gollancz in 2016 and the final part of the trilogy, Terra's War, was self-published in 2021.

== Early life ==
Mitch Benn was born in Liverpool. He was educated at Dovedale Primary School, the then all-boys voluntary aided Liverpool Blue Coat School, followed by the University of Edinburgh, where he was a prominent member of the Edinburgh University Theatre Company at the Bedlam Theatre and performed in the Improverts improvised comedy troupe. He began his comedy career in Edinburgh in 1994, moved to London in 1996 and quickly established himself as a comedy club headliner as well as a favourite on the university circuit. He has one son and daughter, Micah and Astrid (born in November 2005 and May 2008 respectively), with his former wife Clara. He remarried in September 2024.

== Radio and television ==
Benn has often performed on BBC Radio 4 where he was a regular contributor to The Now Show from 1999 to 2016, and BBC Radio 2's It's Been a Bad Week (between 2000 and 2006). He is also an occasional contributor to Jammin' on BBC Radio 2. In 2004, he created his own aptly named series, Mitch Benn's Crimes Against Music on Radio 4, featuring Robin Ince and Alfie Joey; this ran to three series. In 2005, he started a series for BBC7 called The Mitch Benn Music Show, where he played records of comic songs and invited musical comedians into the studio to perform. He took a small role as Pseudopodic Creature in the Quintessential Phase of Radio 4's The Hitchhiker's Guide to the Galaxy in 2005. From around then until 2014, he also appeared on BBC Radio 2's Steve Wright in the Afternoon as the voice of "Elvis" in the "Ask Elvis" feature.

On television Benn appeared singing a song about the PlayStation 3's yellow light of death on BBC One's consumer affairs programme Watchdog plus other videos, including budget airlines [How Much Will It Cost Me Ryan Air?], and Virgin Media customer services [Virgin Bills Dead People].

Benn has performed stand-up on Live at Jongleurs and The Comedy Store for the Paramount Comedy Channel, as well as two appearances with his band the Distractions (see below) for The World Stands Up (Paramount/Comedy Central). He appeared as "King Wonderful" in the CBBC comedy show Stupid! and has contributed to a couple of "talking head" nostalgia shows: X-Rated; The Videos They Tried To Ban (Channel 4) and Fifty Greatest Comedy Characters (Five). He also contributed occasional songs to Channel 4's Bremner, Bird and Fortune.

Benn regularly plays live shows at clubs and festivals in Britain, and has toured extensively overseas, including South Africa, Hong Kong, Australia and Singapore. In August 2007 he completed a successful run at the Edinburgh Fringe, performing a two-hour show, The Mitch Benn Music Club, with the Distractions. He completed a national UK tour in December 2008, the Sing Like an Angel tour, which coincided with the release of his sixth album, of the same name. Benn toured the UK again during October and November 2009 and continues to play across the country and regularly performs at the Edinburgh Fringe Festival. Together with the Distractions he ran a regular musical comedy night at the Phoenix (Cavendish Square) called The Distraction Club.

In November 2010, he released "I'm Proud of the BBC", a song listing many of the corporation's achievements. The track was available for download only and made it to 11 in the Independent Singles Chart.

In September 2013, he took over the role of Zaphod Beeblebrox in the touring production of The Hitchhiker's Guide to the Galaxy Live Radio Show.

He was invited onto Celebrity Mastermind in 2016 and won, with his chosen category of Peter Cook. Series 15, episode 4, first broadcast on 22 December 2016.

Benn was Team Captain for the University of Edinburgh in the Christmas Special of University Challenge 2018, which was broadcast on 1 January 2019. The final score was Edinburgh 120, LSE 160.

In Autumn 2020, Benn was a member of the Walruses in Series 16 of the BBC Two quiz show Only Connect alongside actress and writer Emma Kennedy and Mastermind finalist Dan Adler. His team reached the quarter-final round but were eliminated in the 17th episode of the series broadcast on 11 January 2021.

=== Twitter ===
During the 26th series of The Now Show broadcast between March and April 2009 Benn launched an attempt to increase his follows. Annoyed at the fact that only a few people followed him on Twitter, Benn planned to make himself the "King of Twitter" by getting the show's 1.5 million listeners to follow his account and therefore have more followers than Stephen Fry, who he claimed was the current king. Within a week of his announcement, the number of people following Benn more than tripled, from about 1,200 followers to just under 4,000. Later in the same series, Benn performed a song expressing his anger that Coldplay beat him into having more followers than Fry first, making remarks that it was not the band themselves posting messages and that as the band has four members, the number of followers should have been divided by four. Benn also mentioned that some of his followers were worried that he was becoming too obsessed with Twitter. In the last episode of the series, Benn wrote what he claimed was his final Twitter song, which specially featured Fry telling Benn that if he renounced his claim as King of Twitter, Fry would make him "Viceroy of Facebook", which Benn did. Benn also referenced the passing of the one million mark on the site.

In October 2009, "The History of the World Through Twitter", co-written by Benn and his fellow Now Show presenter Jon Holmes, was published by Prion Books.

In 2014, Benn contributed a story to the first volume of stories "Dead Funny", edited by Robin Ince and Johnny Mains published by Salt Publishing.

Together with his then wife, Benn ran a Twitter feed for their daughter, Astrid (who was four years old at the time it was created), "Stuff Astrid Says". They have so far declined to create a Twitter feed for the family dog "Rowlf", despite requests.

== Edinburgh shows ==
Benn is a regular performer at the Edinburgh Festival Fringe:

- Kendall Mitch Cake (1995)
- Kendall Mitch Cake 2 (1996)
- The A to Z of Comedy (1997)
- Mitch Benn (1997)
- The Bootleg Bootleg Beatles (1998)
- Mitch Benn (1998)
- Carlton Comedy Warehouse (1999)
- Mitch Benn (1999)
- Mitch Benn and the Distractions (2003)
- The World Stands Up (2006)
- The Mitch Benn Music Club (2007)
- Mitch Benn (2011)
- Reduced Circumstances (2012)
- Mitch Benn is the 37th Beatle (2013)
- Don't Believe a Word (2014)
- That Was the Future (2015)
- Don't Fear The Reaper (2016)
- I'm Still Here (2017)
- Doing It On Purpose (2018)
- Ten Songs to Save the World (2019)
- It's About Time (2022)
- The Point (2023)
- The World's Cleverest Idiot (2024)
- Kendall Mitch Cake 3 (2024)
- The Lehrer Effect (2025)
- Asking Elvis (2026)

In May 2025, Benn also performed extensively at the inaugural Rik Mayall Comedy in Droitwich, performing his solo show about Rik Mayall and in a separate performance with a band, which included a guest appearance by Ronnie Golden, who had appeared in series 1, episode 2 of the Young Ones as Buddy Holly.

In June 2025, he premiered his Fringe show about the American comedy songwriter Tom Lehrer, giving insight to the comedy songwriter and to his own career writing songs.

In June 2026, he presented his new Fringe show about the ten years he spent as the voice of Elvis for the "Ask Elvis2" feature on the Radio 2 show Steve Wright in the Afternoon. One reviewer noted that: "Mitch looks nothing like Elvis, but with only a pair of aviator sunglasses and a typically Elvis medallion, he becomes him."

== Albums ==
Benn has released eight CDs to date: The Unnecessary Mitch Benn (1998), a collection of favourite live songs, recorded on a MiniDisc machine carried in his pocket at various gigs that year; Radio Face (2002), including material previously heard on Radio 2 and Radio 4; and, with the Distractions, Too Late To Cancel (2004), and Crimes Against Music (2005). The single "Everything Sounds Like Coldplay Now" was released in September 2005 as a taster for the album, hitting the lower regions of the UK chart, and, as of December 2005, the video (see external link) is still receiving heavy rotation on the Paramount Comedy Channel. The Distractions are Kirsty Newton of the band Siskin (vocals, bass and keyboard) and Ivan Sheppard (drums), who replaced Tasha Baylis (also of Weapons) in 2006. Benn provides most of the vocals and plays the guitar. As well as touring and releasing material, the band support Benn for some of his comedy programmes, such as the Mitch Benn's Crimes Against Music.

In October 2007, a fifth album, The Official Edinburgh Bootleg 2007 (swiftly dubbed "The Brown Album" because of its mock brown paper cover art), recorded on the final night of his show at the Edinburgh Fringe, was made available exclusively to those who attended his autumn 2007 tour.

In March 2008, Benn released the single "Happy Birthday War", to commemorate the fifth anniversary of the Iraq War, with an accompanying video.

The release of his sixth album, Sing Like an Angel, coincided with his autumn 2008 tour of the same name. The title track, featuring Rick Wakeman on piano, was released as a single on iTunes on 1 September 2008. A video was produced to accompany the single.

In October 2009, Benn released his seventh album, Where Next?. His eighth studio album, Breaking Strings, was released in March 2012. It features "I'm Proud of the BBC", "I Love My Phone", "The Library" and "Song for Europe".

For Comic Relief in 2013, Benn took on the challenge of writing, performing and producing an entire album in the space of 24 hours, starting at 9am on 15 March. The song titles were suggested by audience members of the Now Show, the whole process was live streamed and the finished work was released with all proceeds going to Comic Relief.

Benn uses and endorses Line 6 guitars and amplification. His current on-stage rig consists of a Variax 700 (replacing the Variax 500 as seen on the cover of Crimes Against Music) played through a PodxtLive.

== Awards ==
In 1995, Benn won the Best New Comedian competition at the Glastonbury Festival, and played there every year until 2016.

In May 2007, he won BBC Radio Merseyside's "Scouseology" award for his work on radio.

In October 2007, he was awarded "Personality of the Year" at the final Cult TV convention

In January 2008, Benn was listed among the "Scouserati", a list of 365 culturally significant Liverpudlians published by the Liverpool Echo to commemorate the beginning of Liverpool's tenure as the European Capital of Culture.

== Weight loss ==
Having always struggled with obesity (a previous slimming attempt in 2008 having been covered in his blog), Benn began the Lighter Life very low calorie diet programme in January 2011; according to his Twitter account, by the end of June 2011 he had lost more than 10 stone (140 lb/64 kg).

== Discography ==
=== Albums ===
- The Unnecessary Mitch Benn (1998)
- Radio Face (2002)
- Too Late To Cancel (2004)
- Crimes Against Music (2005)
- The Official Edinburgh Bootleg 2007 (2007)
- Sing Like An Angel (2008)
- Where Next? (2009)
- Breaking Strings (2012)
- The Fuck The Tories Album (2024)
- The Imperfectionist (2024)
- The Disillusionist (2026)

=== Singles ===
- "Everything Sounds Like Coldplay Now" (2005)
- "Happy Birthday War" (2008)
- "I'm Proud of the BBC" (2010)
- "I'm Moving to Scotland" (2019)
- "Fuck All" (2020)
- "Everybody in America is Female" (2025)
- "ICE ICE (Maybe)" (2026)
