= Crimes Against Music =

Studio album by Mitch Benn and The Distractions
- Released: 2005
- Recorded: ???
- Genre: Comic rock
- Label: IMWP
- Producer: Ian Mark Wilson

Mitch Benn and The Distractions chronology
Too Late To Cancel (2004)	Crimes Against Music (2005)	The Official Edinburgh Bootleg 2007 (2007)

Crimes Against Music is the fourth album by Mitch Benn, released in 2005 under the name of 'Mitch Benn and The Distractions' and featuring his backing band composed of Kirsty Newton (of Siskin) and Tasha Baylis (of Hepburn). All songs were written by Mitch Benn, and many songs had previous versions feature in the radio shows The Now Show, It's Been a Bad Week and Mitch Benn's Crimes Against Music, which shares a name with the album.

== Track listing ==
1. "Minute's Noise For John"
2. "Everything Sounds Like Coldplay Now"
3. "This Year's Boy"
4. "Sometimes You Just Can't Move For Elton John"
5. "IKEA"
6. "Glam On A Budget"
7. "Chambers Of The Heart"
8. "Too Much Money"
9. "This Ain't Your Country Anymore"
10. "These Ghoulish Things"
11. "Right Now Baby"
12. "Waving At The Poor"
