= Kurtzweil =

Kurtzweil may refer to:

- Alvin Kurtzweil, a character in The X-Files (film)
- A misspelling of the surname Kurzweil
