= Sisters (The Bluebells album) =

Studio album by The Bluebells
- Released: 10 July 1984
- Studios: Highland Studios, Inverness; Jam Studios, London
- Genres: Indie pop; new wave; jangle pop
- Labels: London Records (UK); Sire Records (USA); Last Night From Glasgow
- Producers: Colin Fairley, Bob Andrews, Elvis Costello, Alan Shacklock

The Bluebells chronology
| The Bluebells (1983) | Sisters (1984) | Second (1992) |

Professional ratings
Review scores
| Source | Rating |
|---|---|
| AllMusic | 4/5 stars |
| The Encyclopedia of Popular Music | 3/5 stars |
| The Rolling Stone Album Guide | 3.5/5 stars |

Sisters is the debut album by Scottish indie pop band the Bluebells, released in 1984.

The only "proper" full-length album released by the band during their short career (1983's The Bluebells was a mini-album released in the U.S. showcasing their singles), Sisters featured remixed versions of earlier singles "Cath" and "Everybody's Somebody's Fool" as well as the contemporary singles "I'm Falling" and "Young at Heart". The album reached No. 22 on the UK Albums Chart in August 1984.

In 2020, it was announced that the album would be re-released by Last Night From Glasgow, on their Past Night From Glasgow label, on vinyl and CD.

== Critical reception ==
The Rolling Stone Album Guide called Sisters "highly accomplished and truly smart pop." Trouser Press deemed it "utterly wonderful," writing that the songs are "subtly shaded with country fiddles and mandolins, ringing guitars, a light bouncy beat and choruses that you’ll be humming all the way home." NME listed it as the 50th best album of 1984.

== Track listing ==
All songs by Robert Hodgens, except where noted. All songs produced by Bob Andrews and Colin Fairley, except where noted.

=== Original release ===
1. "Everybody's Somebody's Fool" – 3:40
2. "Young at Heart" (Robert Hodgens, Bobby Valentino, Siobhan Fahey, Sara Dallin, Keren Woodward) – 3:24
3. "I'm Falling" (Robert Hodgens, Kenneth McCluskey) – 5:12
4. "Will She Always Be Waiting" – 4:10 Produced by Elvis Costello and Colin Fairley
5. "Cath" – 3:07
6. "Red Guitars" – 3:14
7. "Syracuse University" – 4:30
8. "Learn to Love" – 3:35 Produced by Alan Shacklock
9. "The Patriot Game" (Dominic Behan) – 4:00 Produced by The Bluebells
10. "South Atlantic Way" – 5:38

=== Cassette version ===
Side one

1. "Everybody's Somebody's Fool" – 3:40
2. "Young at Heart" (Robert Hodgens, Siobhan Fahey, Sara Dallin, Keren Woodward) – 3:24
3. "I'm Falling" (Robert Hodgens, Kenneth McCluskey) – 5:12
4. "Will She Always Be Waiting" – 4:10 Produced by Elvis Costello and Colin Fairley
5. "Cath" – 3:07
6. "Holland" (Kenneth McCluskey, David McCluskey) – 3:30

Side two

1. "Red Guitars" – 3:14
2. "Syracuse University" – 4:30
3. "Learn to Love" – 3:35 Produced by Alan Shacklock
4. "The Patriot Game" (Dominic Behan) – 4:00 Produced by The Bluebells
5. "South Atlantic Way" – 5:38
6. "Aim in Life" (McCluskey) – 3.02 Produced by Elvis Costello

== Personnel ==
- Kenneth McCluskey – lead vocals, harmonica
- Neil Baldwin – bass (2, 6, 7, 10)
- Robert Hodgens – vocals, guitar
- Craig Gannon – guitar (1, 6, 7, 10)
- David McCluskey – drums
- Bobby Valentino – violin
- Laurence Donegan – bass (2–5, 8, 9)
- Russell Irvine – guitar (2–5, 8, 9)
- Ray Russell – string arrangements

Technical

- Derek Ridgers, Paul Cox – photography
- Peter Barrett – artwork
- Recorded at Highland Studios, Inverness and Jam Studios, London; mixed at Abbey Road Studios and Red Bus Studios, London
