= It's Different for Girls =

1979 single by Joe Jackson

"It’s Different for Girls"

Single by Joe Jackson

from the album I'm the Man
- B-side: "Friday" (UK); "Come On" (US)
- Released: 30 November 1979 (UK)
- Recorded: March 1979; TW Studios, Fulham, London
- Genre: New wave
- Length: 3:42
- Label: A&M
- Songwriter: Joe Jackson
- Producer: David Kershenbaum

Joe Jackson singles chronology
"I'm the Man" (1979)	"It’s Different for Girls" (1979)	"Kinda Kute" (1980)

"It’s Different for Girls" is a song by Joe Jackson appearing on his 1979 album, I'm the Man. The song has since become one of his most successful singles, being the highest charting Joe Jackson single in the UK. Covers have been recorded and released by several artists.

== Background ==
"It's Different for Girls" contained lyrics that feature Jackson "deliberately turn[ing] clichés on their head" in that, while originally sounding as if the song would suggest that the male protagonist was looking for sex and his female partner was looking for love, the opposite is revealed to be the case. Jackson later said on the song's lyrics:

It was something that I heard somewhere that struck me as a cliché. The sort of thing that someone might say. And again, I thought, What could that be about? And that maybe the idea was to turn it on its head and have a conversation between a man and a woman and what you'd expect to be the typical roles are reversed. So that was the idea of that.

— Joe Jackson, Songfacts, 2012

Taken from the Gold-certified 1979 album I'm the Man, "It's Different for Girls" was Joe Jackson's biggest UK chart single, peaking at #5 in the UK Singles Chart and #101 in Billboard. The song was backed with another track from I'm the Man, "Friday," in Britain, but in America, a live cover of the Chuck Berry song "Come On" was used instead.

=== Other appearances ===
Apart from appearing as a single and on the album I'm the Man, "It's Different for Girls" has also appeared on other Joe Jackson albums. A live version appeared on Live 1980/86 in 1987, having been recorded on Jackson's Big World tour in 1986. A different live version appeared on the 2000 album Summer in the City: Live in New York.

A new studio recording of the song by Jackson, slightly retitled "Different For Girls" and recorded as a duet with Joy Askew, was included on the 12-inch vinyl and CD formats of Jackson's 1991 single "Stranger than Fiction". On the Laughter and Lust tour in 1991, it was performed as a duet with Mindy Jostyn, and their performance of the song at Sydney was included on the 1992 release Laughter & Lust Live.

The original version of the song was also included on Jackson's 1990 compilation Stepping Out: The Very Best of Joe Jackson and again on the 1997 compilation This Is It! (The A&M Years 1979–1989). "Come On" was released as a bonus track on the 2001 reissue of I'm the Man - prior to this it had only been available on Propaganda, a 1979 A&M records sampler notable for live tracks from Joe Jackson and The Police.

In 1999, it was featured on the soundtrack of the MTV film 200 Cigarettes.

== Composition ==
The song opens with a simple repeated two-note pattern on guitar which is quickly joined by a pulse on bass and drums. The first section of the verse remains quiet, with these instruments and the singer's voice being the main components. In the second section of the verse the dynamics change, with two strident beats on the lyrics "She said", and then drop back down to a quieter chorus driven by a slow arpeggiated guitar pattern, over which the vocal floats in a more complex melody, before returning to the original two-note guitar and bass pulse of the introduction.

== Critical reception ==
Upon its release, David Hepworth of Smash Hits described "It's Different for Girls" as "a very good song but a mite too sprawling and unfocused to be much of a hit". James Belsey of the Bristol Evening Post picked it as the newspaper's "single of the week" and noted the "attractive sound" and "nicely observed lyrics". He concluded it was "by far the best single release so far from the talented Joe Jackson". In the US, Billboard wrote, "Though the lyrics may be scathing, the instrumentation is laidback and backup singers provide nice harmonies." Record World called it "a power pop ballad with echoing vocals and keyboards that carry Jackson's thoughtfully poignant message about male/female roles."

In 2007, Freaky Trigger ranked the song at number 52 in its list of "The Top 100 Songs of All Time". Glide Magazine ranked it as Jackson's 5th best song.

== Personnel ==
- Joe Jackson – vocals
- Gary Sanford – guitar
- Graham Maby – bass, vocals
- David Houghton – drums, vocals

== Charts ==
Chart (1979)	Peak position
Australia (Kent Music Report)	85
Irish Singles Chart	4
Netherlands (Tipparade)	6
UK Singles Chart	5
US Billboard Hot 100	101

== Cover versions ==
=== Siskin version ===
"It's Different for Girls"

Single by Siskin

from the album Siskin
- Released: December 2008
- Genre: Pop
- Length: 3:07
- Label: Siskin Music
- Songwriter: Joe Jackson
- Producer: Stephen Lironi

Siskin singles chronology
"It's Different for Girls" (2008)	"Find a Better Life" (2009)

"It's Different for Girls" was covered by English duo Siskin, as their debut single in 2008. It is the group's only cover version to date.

==== Personnel ====
- Galen Ayers - guitar, vocals
- Kirsty Newton - keyboards, bass, vocals

=== Other versions ===
- In 2008, The Feeling released a cover of the song as a B side to their single Without You, the second single from their second studio album Join with us.
- In 2019, Trevor Horn performed an orchestral arrangement of the song on his album Trevor Horn Reimagines the Eighties, featuring Marillion's Steve Hogarth on lead vocals.
- In January 2022, the Smile, comprising Radiohead members Thom Yorke and Jonny Greenwood and drummer Tom Skinner, performed the song at two of their debut shows in London.
