= Holly and the Italians (album) =

- Cover photo by Antoine Giacomoni

Studio album by Holly Beth Vincent
- Released: Late 1982
- Recorded: 1982
- Studios: Olympic, London; The Garden, London; Mediasound, New York City
- Genre: New wave
- Length: 43:07
- Labels: Virgin; Epic (US only)
- Producer: Mike Thorne

Holly Beth Vincent chronology
The Right to Be Italian (1981)	Holly and the Italians (1982)	America (1993)

Singles from Holly and the Italians
- 1. "For What It's Worth (What's That Sound)" / "Dangerously" Released: 1982; 2. "Honalu" / "Revenge" Released: 1982 (UK only)

Professional ratings
Review scores
Source	Rating
AllMusic	4/5 stars

Holly and the Italians is the first studio album released by the American singer Holly Beth Vincent as a solo artist, in 1982.

== Track listings (American release) ==
All songs written by Holly Beth Vincent, except where indicated.

Side one

1. "Honalu" – 3:50
2. "Dangerously" – 5:47
3. "Uptown" – 4:58
4. "Cool Love (Is Spreading Around)" – 4:37
5. "Just Like Me" – 2:20

Side two

6. "For What It's Worth" (Stephen Stills) – 3:19 (Buffalo Springfield cover)
7. "We Danced" – 3:05
8. "Revenge" – 3:40
9. "Unoriginal Sin" – 6:10
10. "Samurai and Courtesan" – 5:21

== Track listings (European release) ==
Side one

1. "Honalu" – 3:50
2. "For What It’s Worth" – 3:19
3. "Only Boy" – 4:02
4. "Revenge" – 3:40
5. "Samurai and Courtesan" – 5:21

Side two

6. "Cool Love (Is Spreading Around) – 4:37
7. "Uptown" – 4:58
8. "We Danced" – 3:05
9. "Unoriginal Sin" – 6:10
10. "Just Like Me" – 2:20

== Personnel ==
- Holly Beth Vincent – vocals, guitars, additional drums and synthesizer on track 6
- Mike Thorne – keyboards, producer
- Bobby Valentino – violin, mandolin
- Bobby Collins – bass
- Kevin Wilkinson – drums

Additional musicians

- John Gatchell – trumpet on track 1
- Robert Medici – marimba on track 6
- Joey Ramone – backing vocals on track 7

Production

- Harvey Goldberg – engineer, mixing
- Don Wershba, Gareth Jones – assistant engineers
- Jack Skinner – mastering at Sterling Sound, New York
