= The Right to Be Italian =

- Cover photo by Lynn Goldsmith

Studio album by Holly and the Italians
- Released: February 1981
- Recorded: September–December 1980
- Studios: Record Plant, New York City
- Genres: New wave, pop punk
- Length: 36:37
- Label: Virgin
- Producer: Richard Gottehrer

Holly Beth Vincent chronology
The Right to Be Italian (1981)	Holly and the Italians (1982)

Singles from The Right to Be Italian
- 1. "Miles Away" / "It's Only Me" Released: 1980 (Europe only); 2. "I Wanna Go Home" / "Fanzine" Released: 1981 (Europe only); 3. "Youth Coup" / "Poster Boy" Released: 1981; 4. "Just for Tonight" / "Baby Gets It All" Released: 1981 (UK only); 5. "Miles Away" / "Means to a Den" Released: 1981 (US only)

The Right to Be Italian is the only studio album by the new wave band Holly and the Italians. The album had a troubled recording process that took more than a year to be completed; it was released in February 1981 by Virgin Records. The album was reissued in 2002 in the US by Wounded Bird Records with bonus tracks.

The album peaked at No. 177 on the Billboard 200.

== Critical reception ==
Professional ratings
Review scores
Source	Rating
AllMusic	3/5 stars
The Encyclopedia of Popular Music	3/5 stars
Sounds	3.5/5 stars

Trouser Press called The Right to Be Italian "a new wave classic of romantic ups and downs, leather-jacket rebellion and kitsch culture, carried mightily on Vincent’s tough-girl attitude, full-throated singing, gale-force Brill Building melodies and chunky rhythm guitar presence." The Rough Guide to Rock deemed the album "a lost masterpiece."

== Track listings ==
All songs written by Holly Beth Vincent, except where indicated

Side one

1. "I Wanna Go Home" – 3:57
2. "Baby Gets It All" – 3:14
3. "Youth Coup" – 2:41
4. "Just Young" – 5:23
5. "Miles Away" (Mark Sidgwick) – 3:38

Side two

1. "Tell That Girl to Shut Up" – 2:59
2. "Just for Tonight" (Larry Kusik, Ritchie Adams, Wes Farrell) – 2:38 (The Chiffons cover)
3. "Do You Say Love" – 3:15
4. "Means to a Den" – 3:13
5. "Rock Against Romance" – 5:39

=== 2002 CD edition ===
1. "I Wanna Go Home" – 3:58
2. "Rock Against Romance" – 5:41
3. "Youth Coup" – 2:44
4. "Just Young" – 5:25
5. "Miles Away" – 3:40
6. "Tell That Girl to Shut Up" – 3:02
7. "Just for Tonight" – 2:40
8. "Do You Say Love" – 3:17
9. "Baby Gets It All" – 3:16
10. "Means to a Den" – 3:31
11. "Fanzine" – 2:59
12. "It's Only Me" – 2:17
13. "Poster Boy" – 2:28
14. "Miles Away" (single edit) – 3:27

=== Other editions ===
A 2010 Japanese CD reissue preserves the original track order for the tracks from the original album, but with the same bonus tracks, in the same order, as the 2002 reissue.

== Personnel ==
Holly and the Italians

- Holly Beth Vincent – lead vocals, guitars
- Mark Sidgwick – bass, additional guitars, backing vocals
- Steve Young – drums, backing vocals
- Mike Osborn – drums, African clan drums, percussion, backing vocals

Additional musicians

- Anton Fig – drums on "Just Young"
- Paul Shaffer – grand piano, organ
- Jerry Harrison – synthesizers
- Angela Brand – recorder
- Torrie Zito – string arrangements and conductor
- The Uptown Horns
- Ellie Greenwich – lead vocals on "Just for Tonight"

Production

- Richard Gottehrer – producer
- Thom Panunzio – engineer
- John Brand – remixing
