= Holly Beth Vincent =

American musician (born 1956)

- Also known as: Yllohas
- Born: Holly Beth Cernuto; 1956 (age 69–70); Chicago, Illinois, U.S.
- Genres: New wave; pop punk; alternative rock; tech house
- Occupations: Musician; songwriter; record producer
- Years active: 1974–present
- Labels: Virgin; Epic; Daemon; Mammoth; Wounded Bird

Holly Beth Vincent (born Holly Beth Cernuto in 1956) is an American singer, songwriter, multi-instrumentalist and record producer.

In her youth Vincent sang and played drums and guitar in several bands and took part in the Los Angeles punk scene. In 1978, she formed Holly and the Italians and moved to London, England, where the band was welcomed by the British press and gained a recording contract with Virgin Records on the strength of the single "Tell That Girl to Shut Up". Holly and the Italians' debut album The Right to Be Italian had a troubled and long production and was a commercial failure, which led to the band's dissolution at the end of 1981, after a US tour supporting the Clash and the Ramones.

Vincent recorded under her name the album Holly and the Italians in the UK and was then deported to the US by the British authorities. She went to live in New York City, where she was a member of the Waitresses for a short time and played in other local groups. In 1990, she moved to Los Angeles and two years later recorded the album America with a new band that she had formed called The Oblivious. The album Vowel Movement followed in 1994, as a collaboration with Concrete Blonde singer Johnette Napolitano.

Vincent continues to write and record and recently has released albums mainly in digital format, including two collections of tech house music.

== Career ==
=== Beginnings ===
Vincent was born in Chicago, Illinois, in 1956 to Bob and June Vincent. Her mother was of Swedish and French background and her father, Italian; both of them had been big band singers during the 1940s. In 1962, her family moved to Lake Tahoe, Nevada, where Bob Vincent was the entertainment director of Harrah's Lake Tahoe and where the young Holly came in contact for the first time with professional performing artists. Her brother is drummer Nick Vincent. When ten years old, she received her first acoustic guitar and began composing songs. After three years in Nevada, the family relocated to Los Angeles and Vincent started playing drums in high school bands, performing covers of the Rolling Stones and the Move. She ran away from home in 1972, but later returned to Los Angeles and completed schooling at William Howard Taft Charter High School. At 18, she went to live for a year and half in London, England with Chris Wood and his wife Jeannette; there she auditioned as drummer and met many British musicians, including Mark Knopfler, with whom she started a romantic relationship. Back in California, she earned money with obscure jobs, toured with a series of midwestern bar bands, was the drummer of the rockabilly outfit Brothel Creepers and a member of the all-female punk rock band Backstage Pass, where she played guitar and sang. Her musical and political preferences placed her within the nascent LA punk scene, gravitating around The Masque club.

=== Holly and the Italians ===
In 1978 in Los Angeles Vincent formed the band Holly and the Italians with drummer Steve Young (a.k.a. Steve Dalton), whom she knew from high school. The new band moved to London in early 1979 and Vincent went to live with Knopfler. He introduced Vincent to BBC disc jockey and music historian Charlie Gillett, who was also the owner of Oval Records. Gillett put the new band, which was playing the local club scene at the time, under contract. Their bassist Bruce Lipson did not move to the United Kingdom and was replaced by Briton Mark Sidgwick (a.k.a. Mark Henry), formerly of the band the Boyfriends. Guitarist Colin White also joined the group for live performances.

Through Oval Records, Holly and the Italians released in December 1979 the single "Tell That Girl to Shut Up", which was a minor hit in the UK and stirred the interest of the British music press. The papers treated the band as a major attraction in the period of the new wave explosion and Vincent appeared twice on the front page of Melody Maker, even before the single was released. "Tell That Girl to Shut Up", written by Vincent, became a UK top 50 hit again in 1988 when it was covered by the British pop rock band Transvision Vamp as the second single from their debut album Pop Art. The song was cited by the magazine Mojo as one of the Top 20 Killer New Wave Tracks from the US.

Holly and the Italians went on tour in the UK with the Clash and opened with ska band the Selecter for the American new wave band Blondie at the Hammersmith Odeon in London on 22 January 1980, where they were noticed by renowned photographer Lynn Goldsmith. Goldsmith talked about the band in the United States to Gary Kurfirst, manager of bands such as Blondie, Ramones, the B-52's and Talking Heads, who took Holly and the Italians in his roster. The band eventually signed a two-album deal with Virgin Records, which had already distributed their first single.

Holly and the Italians – "Rock Against Romance" (1981)
The music of this song blends elements of punk rock and power pop, while the partially autobiographical lyrics have references to Vincent's two-months job as a dominatrix in a Los Angeles brothel. The song peaked at No. 75 in the Billboard Dance Club Songs chart in June 1981.

At the beginning of 1980, Holly and the Italians moved to the US and started recording their debut album, The Right to Be Italian, at Electric Lady Studios in New York City with '60s girl-group producer Shadow Morton. The producer was fired halfway through and replaced with Richard Gottehrer, who started from scratch and recorded at Record Plant Studios in New York City the ten songs of the album from September up to December 1980, with Thom Panunzio as engineer. Internal struggles exploded within the group during the recordings and drummer Steve Young quit the band, replaced by Mike Osborn. The album features many additional musicians, such as Paul Shaffer and Anton Fig (who would later be part of the World's Most Dangerous Band, the house band for the Late Show with David Letterman), Jerry Harrison, the Uptown Horns, an orchestra conducted by Torrie Zito and singer Ellie Greenwich on the cover of the Chiffons' song "Just for Tonight". Vincent was unsatisfied with the sound of the album, so The Right to Be Italian was given a final remix in the UK by producer John Brand and finally released in February 1981, more than a year after the project was set in motion. Such a long gestation was very expensive for the record company and detrimental for the band, which lost its initial momentum and was attacked by the music press, turned hostile after a mismatched tour with the Selecter and the Bodysnatchers. The four singles released in the UK did not chart and contemporary reviews were mostly negative, with the album peaking only at No. 177 on the US Billboard 200 chart. The Right to Be Italian was re-evaluated in modern times and considered a pop punk masterpiece. It appears at No. 40 in the article "60 Great Albums You've Probably Never Heard" by Jody Rosen from the November 18, 2013, issue of New York Magazine.

Holly and the Italians went on tour in the US and in August 1980 played the major Heatwave festival near Toronto. The band notably toured with the Selecter, opened for the Clash during their Sandinista! tour pre-Bonds shows in New York City and did several shows around the US with the Ramones. They toured in the UK in the spring of 1981 and appeared on The Old Grey Whistle Test TV show on May 12. After a few more dates in the US in summer 1981, Holly and the Italians were reduced to Vincent and Sidgwick and disbanded by the end of the year.

=== Solo ===
Meanwhile, the love story between Vincent and Knopfler had come to a bitter end, with him recriminating about the use of his name to foster her career. Vincent broke up with him by phone while Dire Straits were on tour. Knopfler's lyrics for Dire Straits song "Romeo and Juliet" are about their failed romance.

Vincent returned to London and was back in a studio in December 1981 to record with Joey Ramone a duet/cover version of Sonny & Cher song "I Got You Babe", which was released as a single in early 1982. It was recorded by Wham! producer Steve Brown and featured Thomas Dolby on synthesizers. The B-side features the song "One More Dance", the last appearance to date of Holly of the Italians on vinyl.

In London, she also worked on a second release to fulfill the two-album deal contract with Virgin Records. The chaos surrounding the release of The Right to Be Italian, its bad critical reception and her breakup with Knopfler were experiences that affected Vincent and her writing greatly. Her second album reflects this, featuring a moodier, more introspective and alternative sound. The album, simply entitled Holly and the Italians, was produced and recorded by Mike Thorne at Olympic Studios with session musicians such as Bobby Valentino, Bobby Collins, Kevin Wilkinson and John Gatchell. While still in production, Vincent performed live some new songs at a few shows in the UK with the musicians who had worked on the album. When she went to the US for the album's mixing at Mediasound Studios in New York City a short time later, the British authorities labelled her as an undesirable alien for her reckless behavior during her stay in the country, making her return impossible.

Holly and the Italians was finally released in late 1982. It was poorly reviewed and largely ignored upon its release and, although the video for the single "For What It's Worth" gained some airtime on MTV, it was not commercially successful. Her manager Gary Kurfirst called the content of the album "suicide music" and terminated his contract with Vincent. In more recent times, the album has been re-evaluated and critically acclaimed. Virgin Records did not renew her contract and she remained in New York City, where she tried to set up a new version of the Italians. She continued to write new songs and record them at own expense, but failed to gain a new record contract.

In 1984, she was invited by Chris Butler to front the post-punk band The Waitresses after the departure of lead singer Patty Donahue; she became a member for a few weeks before the return of Donahue. In that period, she sang in a combo called the Wild Things with Anthony Thistlethwaite (The Waterboys) and Mick Taylor (The Rolling Stones), which released the song "Siberian Mines". She was also in a band with her brother Nick called Bikey that played only one show.

While in New York City, she featured in the indie film "The Dwarf" (1984) directed by Richard Monteverde starring Ann "Anna" Magnuson and studied acting briefly with teacher Catherine Gaffigan.

=== The Oblivious and Vowel Movement ===
In 1990 Vincent relocated to Los Angeles, where she started writing songs for the movie industry. In 1992 Jane Scarpantoni, a cellist who had worked with Vincent in New York, put her in contact with Amy Ray of the Indigo Girls, who asked Vincent to record a new album for her label Daemon Records. Vincent formed a band called The Oblivious, which included the Italians' original drummer Steve Dalton, and recorded with them the album America, which she wrote in its entirety and produced. The album was released in September 1993 on Daemon Records and received good reviews. It was also voted for "album of the year" from the San Francisco Weekly. The Oblivious were chosen as support band for Concrete Blonde's final tour, thanks to Vincent's acquaintance with Concrete Blonde vocalist Johnette Napolitano from the late 70s, when both worked as waitresses at the same Mongolian restaurant in Sherman Oaks, California.

Before Concrete Blonde's disbandment, Vincent and Napolitano teamed up for an album entitled Vowel Movement in early 1994; Vincent performed as drummer, guitarist, and shared vocal duties with Napolitano, who played bass. The two women recorded the music in six days without mixing it before release. Vowel Movement was picked up by Mammoth Records and released in 1995, receiving mixed reviews.

=== Recent activities ===
With the help of her brother Nick, Vincent produced a collection of demos and unreleased songs titled Demos Federico spanning from 1979 to 1998. The double CD was released in 2003 by Wounded Bird Records.

In 2007, Vincent self-produced the album Super Rocket Star, where she composed all the songs and played all instruments. The music of the album shows many influences, ranging from 40s pop to electronica. Super Rocket Star was distributed online through Amazon.com and in digital form on Spotify. The albums Minnesota-California (2009) and Bad Day Beautiful (2012) were distributed in a similar way.

Starting in 2010, Vincent created autonomously techno and tech house music under the pseudonym Yllohas. The tracks were loaded on a now closed SoundCloud space and later collected in the album LAPTOPpOP TECHNOhUM of 2013 and Paperdoll Technologies of 2014.

From 2013 to 2016 Vincent managed her own Bandcamp website, selling her new albums and part of her back catalog in digital format.

She has been voice artist in national commercials for Nike, Nintendo, Pepsi and Squirt.

== Equipment ==
Vincent uses a Squier Stratocaster guitar with a hot rail or a humbucker pickup for extra power.

== Discography ==
=== Holly and the Italians ===
- "Tell That Girl to Shut Up" (single) (1980)
- The Right to Be Italian (1981)

=== Holly Beth Vincent ===
- Holly and the Italians (1982)
- Demos Federico (2003)
- Super Rocket Star (2007)
- Minnesota-California (2009)
- Bad Day Beautiful (2012)
- LAPTOPpOP TECHNOhUM (2013)
- Paperdoll Technologies (2014)
- "Hey Boy" (single) (2015)
- The Hippest Girl (Songs from Benedict Canyon) (2016)
- Minnesota Demos (2016)

=== Holly and Joey ===
- "I Got You Babe" (1982)

=== The Oblivious ===
- America (1993)

=== Johnette Napolitano/Holly Vincent ===
- Vowel Movement (1995)

== Guest appearances ==
- Michael Monroe – Not Fakin' It (1989): backing vocals on "While You Were Looking at Me"
- Joey Ramone – ...Ya Know? (2012): lead vocals on "Party Line", backing vocals
- Buff Roshi – "Paris" (2013): lead vocals

== Film music credits ==
- Untamed Heart (1993) – "Mercy"
- Dead Beat (1994) – "Sometimes"
- The Boys Club (1997) – "Jesus" (as Vowel Movement)

== TV music credits ==
- Rich Girls (2003)
- American Idol (season 10) (2011)
