= I'm Falling =

Single by The Bluebells

from the album Sisters
- Released: 1984
- Genre: Indie pop, new wave
- Length: 5:12
- Label: London, Sire (U.S.)
- Songwriters: Robert Hodgens, David McCluskey
- Producers: Colin Fairley, Robert Andrews

The Bluebells singles chronology
| "Sugar Bridge (It Will Stand)" (1983) | "I'm Falling" (1984) | "Young at Heart" (1984) |

"I'm Falling" is a song by Scottish band the Bluebells, from their debut album Sisters. Released as a single in 1984, it became their first top 20 hit, peaking at No. 11 on the UK Singles Chart and spending a total of 15 weeks on the chart.

== Charts ==
| Chart (1984) | Peak position |
|---|---|
| UK Singles (OCC) | 11 |
| Ireland (IRMA) | 26 |
