= Vowel Movement =

Studio album by Vowel Movement
- Released: 16 May 1995
- Recorded: July 1994
- Length: 41:24
- Label: Mammoth
- Producers: Holly Vincent; Johnette Napolitano

Vowel Movement is the debut and only studio album from Vowel Movement, an American music collaboration between Holly Vincent and Johnette Napolitano, which was released by Mammoth in 1995.

== Background ==
Vincent and Napolitano first met in the late 1970s when they waitressed at the Mongolian restaurant in Sherman Oaks, California. In 1993, Vincent got in touch with Napolitano after she read an interview where Napolitano credited Vincent with influencing her ("she hipped me to the whole punk thing"). Napolitano invited Vincent's band, the Oblivious, to be the opening act on Concrete Blonde's 1993–94 tour promoting Mexican Moon.

Napolitano and Vincent first collaborated together on 31 December 1993. A press release for the Vowel Movement album stated, "Holly and Johnette formed the band on New Year's Eve in 1993 when neither of them had a date. They drank, smoked pot, did each others Tarot cards, then the I-Ching, drank some more, Johnette picked up her bass, Holly got on her drums, Johnette started mumbling, and Vowel Movement was born." Later in July 1994, the pair began recording material together over a period of six days at the Terrarium in Minneapolis and Paramount in Hollywood.

Napolitano told Billboard in 1995, "We just wanted to blow it all out of the water and freestyle it". In a 2006 interview, Vincent recalled of the project, "It was 'two girls, six-days, and a bag of weed the size of your head'... never mixed, just us two goofing around, playing through a Marshall stack, making up the songs on the spot as we went along, laying down the bass and drum parts to start. Pure fun. I still like it. She's [Napolitano] very talented, and such a personality, for better or worse."

== Release ==
After its recording was completed, Napolitano and Vincent presented the material to different labels and it was picked up by Mammoth, who released it as an album on May 16, 1995. At the time of its release, Napolitano was signed to Warner Bros. Records as part of her new band Pretty & Twisted. Warner expressed some concern that the release of Vowel Movement would have a negative impact on the release of the Pretty & Twisted album which followed later in the year. The album originally had a release date of February 28, 1995.

A single, "Dinosaur", was also released to radio on May 16, 1995. Mammoth commissioned a low-budget video for the track. In a 1995 interview with Muse, Napolitano said, "It was so much fun because we were able to take the camera out and do our own shooting and do whatever we wanted."

== Critical reception ==
Professional ratings
Review scores
Source	Rating
The Albuquerque Tribune	A
AllMusic	3/5 stars
Calgary Herald	B−
Entertainment Weekly	B+
The Leader Post	3.5/4 stars
Los Angeles Times	3/4 stars
Southtown Star	2/4 stars
The Vancouver Sun	2/4 stars

On its release, Steve Baltin of Cash Box selected Vowel Movement as the magazine's indie "pick of the week" at the beginning of July 1995. He wrote, "Fans expecting a rehashing of Concrete Blonde will be disappointed, as Napolitano explore[s] new avenues. Still, there's no mistaking her distinctive emoting style, and Vincent complements her well." Mike Flaherty of Entertainment Weekly wrote, "As ethereal and headbanging as the music on Vowel Movement gets, it never succumbs to angst-laden weightiness. Still, you wonder if it was conceived on a drunken lark, as they claim, or if they just grew tired of watching Courtney, Liz, and P.J. have all the fun."

Lorraine Ali of the Los Angeles Times considered the album to be "richly inventive" and the pair's "best work yet". She wrote, "Napolitano's creamy vocals meld with Vincent's more edgy tone, then echo over an atmospheric backdrop of shimmering melodies." Jeffboy Neumann of The Albuquerque Tribune praised it as "a dart winging toward a bull's-eye". He stated, "Vowel Movement is spectacular in the almost psychic cohesion of Johnette's and Holly's playing, [and] the leave-in-the-mistakes intimacy and the bold, off-the-cuff songwriting." Gerry Krochak of the Leader Post described the album as "mysterious, moody and delightfully diverse", with Napolitano and Vincent "gel[ling] wonderfully throughout". Frank Peebles of the Prince George Free Press drew comparisons to Pixies and early Smashing Pumpkins, with shades of Concrete Blonde and the Oblivious. He felt the album was "a surfer-ish, murky, light industrial concept" which "gets back to what 'alternative' used to mean".

James Muretich of the Calgary Herald wrote, "This is the sound of two women letting their hair down [and] the result is loose and definitely intriguing, a kind of raw come hither into the shadows of angry sensuality." However, he felt the album did not meet the standards of Concrete Blonde and that the songs failed to "tap into the talent at hand". Katherine Monk of The Vancouver Sun stated that "the two power femmes do manage to carve out some undeniable black magic with their complementary tones", but added "none of it holds a candle to their best work". She noted the "near-clichéd, feedback-laden rhythm tracks" and felt that most of the songs were "bass-heavy jaunts into loud land with no direction whatsoever". John Everson of the Southtown Star described it as "experimental" and more like a "garage demo than [a] studio album". He said, "There are moments when this album really hits the indie rock mark, but too often it sounds like the studio diary of Johnette and Holly screwing around. It may have been fun at the time, but it doesn't make for a memorable album."

In a retrospective review, Ira Robbins of Trouser Press was critical of Vowel Movement, writing, "Sloppy and undeveloped, indulgent, haphazard and just flat-out noisy, the album occasionally happens onto terra firma, but too much of it flails along shapelessly." Tom Demalon of AllMusic considered the album to be a "decidedly low-key and often lo-fi affair that finds the pair getting back somewhat to the duo's punk roots". He noted the tracks "unfinished, embryonic quality" and concluded, "It's a fly-on-the-wall experience for the listener that mainly satisfies best as a curiosity for fans of these two women."

== Track listing ==
All tracks are written by Holly Vincent and Johnette Napolitano.

No.	Title	Length
1.	"Dinosaur"	3:20
2.	"Hitchhiker"	1:55
3.	"Frank"	6:10
4.	"When We Collide"	4:53
5.	"I Don't Wanna"	1:22
6.	"Las Vegas"	2:32
7.	"Death of a Surfer"	4:05
8.	"Vowel Movement (A-E-I-O-U)"	4:14
9.	"Ohohoh"	1:46
10.	"Jackie Baby"	1:17
11.	"Gecko"	3:42
12.	"Jesus"	2:24
13.	"Tiny Music"	1:39
14.	"Jackie Baby" (Extended Version)	2:05

== Personnel ==
Vowel Movement

- Holly Vincent – vocals, guitar, drums
- Johnette Napolitano – vocals, bass

Production

- Holly Vincent, Johnette Napolitano – producers
- Ross Kempi, Alex Gordon, Anne Catalino – recording
- Jeffoto – photography
