= John Richard Parsons =

English writer and artist

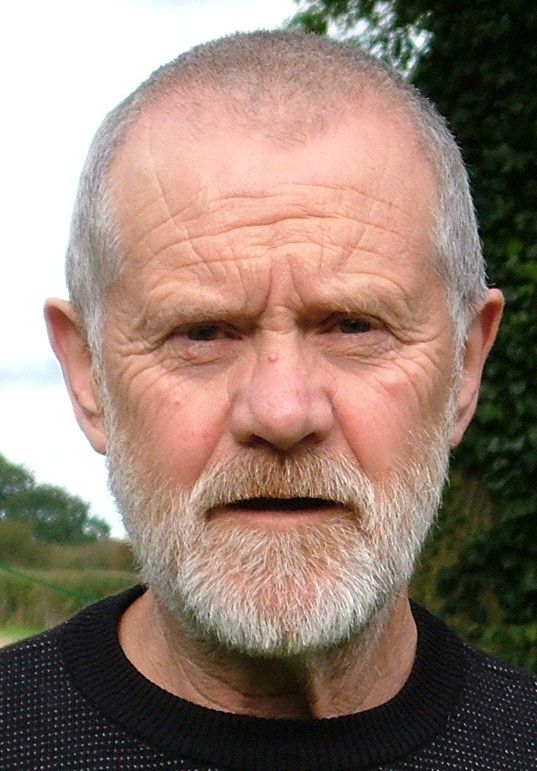
- Born: John Richard Parsons; 7 May 1941; Northampton, England
- Occupations: Writer, artist

John Richard Parsons (born 7 May 1941) is an English writer and artist, noted for his prize-winning haiku poetry. He taught etching and lithography at Central Saint Martins school of art from 1962 to 1968. His art and sculpture are both figurative and abstract, and draw on many sources of inspiration, particularly prehistoric, Indian and tribal traditions. His work is noted for his attention to colour, material and technique.

== Background ==
Parsons was born in Northampton, England, on 7 May 1941. His mother had been evacuated as a refugee from the London Blitz where his grandfather was a Master Mason. He attended The Latymer School at Edmonton, London (1953–1958). He studied printmaking and painting at Hornsey College of Art (1958–1962). He has read and travelled widely, and cites the work of Arthur Koestler and Carl Jung as philosophical influences, and tantric Buddhism, Hinduism and tribal art as artistic influences. He cites the work of R.H. Blyth, a devotee of Japanese culture, as an early inspiration for his poetic writing, and Brian Coffey as a poetic mentor.

== Work ==
=== Writing ===
==== Poetry ====
The poetry of Japanese haiku, haibun, senryu and tanka has been a strong influence on Parsons' writing, as has the evocative and concise poetry of Imagism. He is an internationally recognised writer of haiku and haibun in English, and has won prizes, awards and commendations at many competitions, including first prizes at the Kikakuza Haibun Contest (2009); Klostar Ivanic Festival (2012), the Yamadera Basho Memorial Museum (2012), the Kumamoto City Festival (2012). His work has widely appeared in anthologies, including 'Blithe Spirit', the quarterly journal of the British Haiku Society. It has also appeared in individual volumes of his poetry published by Advent Books, Hub Publications and Labyrinth Books. He judged the haibun section in the British Haiku Society Awards, 2014. His haiku work has been reviewed by Piper Charlton in a reader response essay for Millikin University, 2021.

==== Song lyrics ====
Parsons contributed lyrics to the rock band Fabulous Poodles (1975–1980), including "Mirror Star", "Chicago Boxcar", "Bionic Man", "Toytown People", "Tit Photographer's Blues", "B Movies", "Workshy" and "Cherchez La Femme". He has been called the group's chief songwriter and 'unseen fifth poodle'.

==== Essays ====
Parsons contributed the essay 'Brian Coffey and The Two Fat Ladies' to the monograph 'Other Edens' on the life and work of Brian Coffey.

=== Artwork ===
==== Sculpture ====
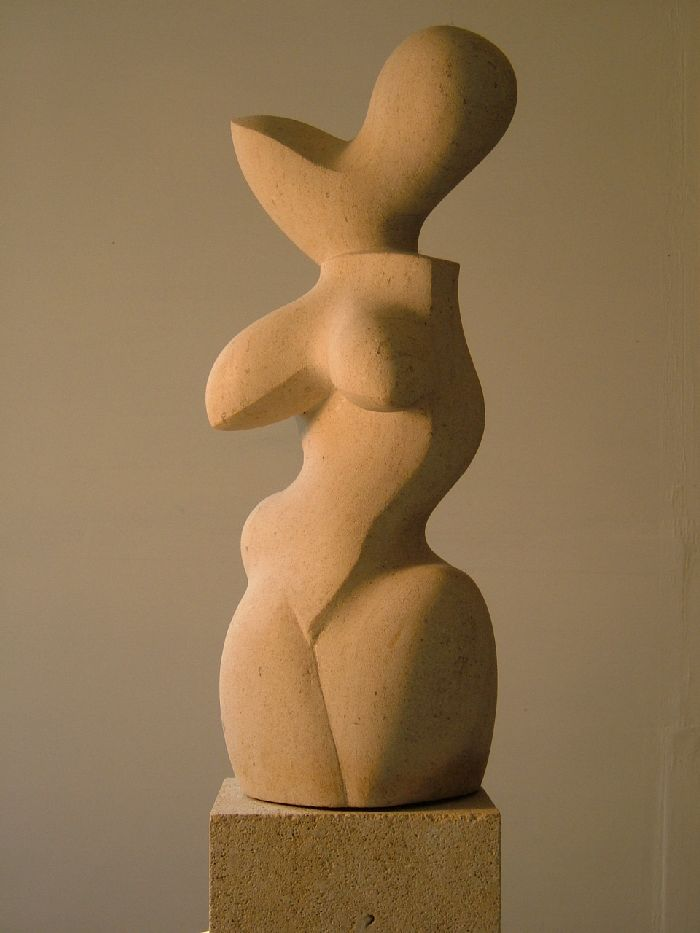
Early Limestone Goddess, by John R. Parsons

Parsons' early sculptural work was influenced by the work of Henry Moore and Barbara Hepworth, and his interest in archetypal themes grew after the publication of 'The Great Mother' by Erich Neumann. After visiting the megalithic temples of Malta in the 1980s, he began carving statues and figurines which drew their inspiration from Neolithic Mediterranean culture. He expanded his artistic repertoire in the 2000s after travelling in India. His experience of tantric Buddhism, Indian art and ethnographic art initiated a period of experimentation with meditative, naturalistic and primal forms in different types of stone, resulting in the Stones Series. More recently, the driftwood of the Norfolk coast has given rise to the Assemblage Series of abstract sculptures. His work is in many private collections.

==== Works on paper ====
Parsons taught etching and lithography at Central St Martins School of Art from 1962 to 1968. He works eclectically in both figurative and abstract styles. He has illustrated a wide variety of books ranging from natural history to poetry, as well as his own books of poetry with pen and ink drawings on abstract themes. He illustrated the volume 'Initial Response: An A-Z of Haiku Moments' by Maeve O'Sullivan, and contributed artwork to three volumes of 'Blithe Spirit', the journal of the British Haiku Society.
