= Young at Heart (Bananarama song) =

1982 song by Bananarama

Song by Bananarama

from the album Deep Sea Skiving
- Released: 1983
- Length: 3:13
- Label: London
- Songwriters: Sara Dallin; Siobhan Fahey; Keren Woodward; Robert Hodgens
- Producer: Barry Blue

"Young at Heart" is a song by the English pop group Bananarama from their debut studio album, Deep Sea Skiving (1983). The song was later recorded by the Scottish band the Bluebells, whose version reached the top of the UK singles chart after a re-release in 1993.

== Bananarama version ==
Bananarama's version of the song is credited to Sara Dallin, Siobhan Fahey and Keren Woodward of Bananarama, and Robert Hodgens of the Bluebells, Fahey's then-boyfriend.

== Bluebells version ==
"Young at Heart"
- 1984 single cover

Single by the Bluebells

from the album Sisters
- B-side: "Tender Mercy" (1984); "I'm Falling" (1993)
- Released: 11 June 1984
- Length: 3:27
- Label: London
- Songwriters: Robert Hodgens; Siobhan Fahey; Bobby Valentino
- Producers: Colin Fairley, Robert Andrews

The Bluebells singles chronology
"I'm Falling" (1984)	"Young at Heart" (1984)	"Cath" (re-issue) (1984)

Music video
- "Young at Heart" on YouTube

"Young at Heart" was reworked in 1984 by the Bluebells, a version originally credited to Hodgens and Fahey upon its re-release in 1993. In 2002, the session musician Bobby Valentino, who performed the violin solo on the Bluebells' version of "Young at Heart", won the right to be recognised as co-author of the song after taking legal action.

The Bluebells' version of the song was a UK top-10 chart success on two occasions, first reaching number eight on the UK Singles Chart during its original release in 1984. Almost a decade later, after the Bluebells had disbanded, the song was re-released as a single on 15 March 1993 after being featured in a British TV advert for the Volkswagen Golf. It became a number-one hit on the UK chart for four weeks, leading to the band reforming temporarily to perform the song on BBC Television's Top of the Pops.

=== Track listings ===
==== 1984 release ====
- 7-inch single

A. "Young at Heart"
B. "Tender Mercy"

- Japanese 7-inch single

A. "Young at Heart"
B. "Everybody's Somebody's Fool"

==== 1993 release ====
- UK 7-inch and cassette single
1. "Young at Heart" – 3:27
2. "I'm Falling" – 4:09
- UK CD single
1. "Young at Heart" – 3:27
2. "Cath" (remix) – 3:15
3. "I'm Falling" – 4:09
4. "The Patriot Game" – 4:14

=== Charts ===
==== Weekly charts ====
Chart (1984)	Peak position
Ireland (IRMA)	13
UK Singles (Official Charts)	8

Chart (1993)	Peak position
Europe (Eurochart Hot 100)	8
Europe (European Hit Radio)	25
Germany (GfK)	55
Iceland (Íslenski Listinn Topp 40)	30
Ireland (IRMA)	1
Netherlands (Dutch Top 40)	20
Netherlands (Single Top 100)	15
Portugal (AFP)	3
UK Singles (Official Charts)	1
UK Airplay (Music Week)	3

==== Year-end charts ====
Chart (1984)	Position
UK Singles (Gallup)	84

Chart (1993)	Position
Europe (Eurochart Hot 100)	64
UK Singles (OCC)	12
UK Airplay (Music Week)	49

=== Certifications ===
Region	Certification	Certified units/sales
United Kingdom (BPI)	Gold	400,000^{^}
^{^} Shipments figures based on certification alone.
