= The Bluebells (EP) =

EP by The Bluebells
- Released: October 1983
- Genre: Indie pop; new wave
- Length: 16:21
- Label: Sire

The Bluebells chronology
The Bluebells (1983)	Sisters (1984)

Professional ratings
Review scores
Source	Rating
AllMusic	3/5 stars
Christgau's Record Guide	B

The Bluebells is a five-song EP, or mini-album as it states on the record, by Scottish indie new wave band The Bluebells, released in 1983 by Sire Records. It was only released in the US and Canada to showcase singles released in the UK.

== Reception ==
The album was reviewed in Billboard: "This young quintet makes its five-track debut a celebration of the pop virtues of '60s Merseybeat, with ringing guitars, harmonica and fresh vocal harmonies the order of the day. The thrust is on romantic rock, although the group also offers an earnest new version of [Dominic] Behan's "Patriots Game", a clear-eyed lament for the unceasing turmoil in Ireland."

== Track listing ==
Side A
No.	Title	Writer(s)	Producer(s)	Length
1.	"Cath"	Robert Hodgens	Colin Fairley, The Bluebells	3:05
2.	"Everybody's Somebody's Fool"	Robert Hodgens	Colin Fairley, Robin Millar	2:28
3.	"Patriots Game"	Dominic Behan	The Bluebells	4:02

Side B
No.	Title	Writer(s)	Producer(s)	Length
4.	"Sugar Bridge"	Robert Hodgens	Alan Tarney	3:42
5.	"Aim in Life"	Kenneth McCluskey	Elvis Costello	3:04
Total length:				16:21

== Personnel ==
The Bluebells

- Robert Hodgens – vocals, guitar
- David McCluskey – vocals, guitar, drums
- Russell Irvine – lead guitar
- Lawrence Donegan – bass guitar
- Kenneth McCluskey – vocals, mouth organ, flageolet

Technical

- Fraser Taylor – illustration
- Paul Cox – photography
- Simon Halfon, Robert Hodgens – design
