= The Bluebells =

Scottish band

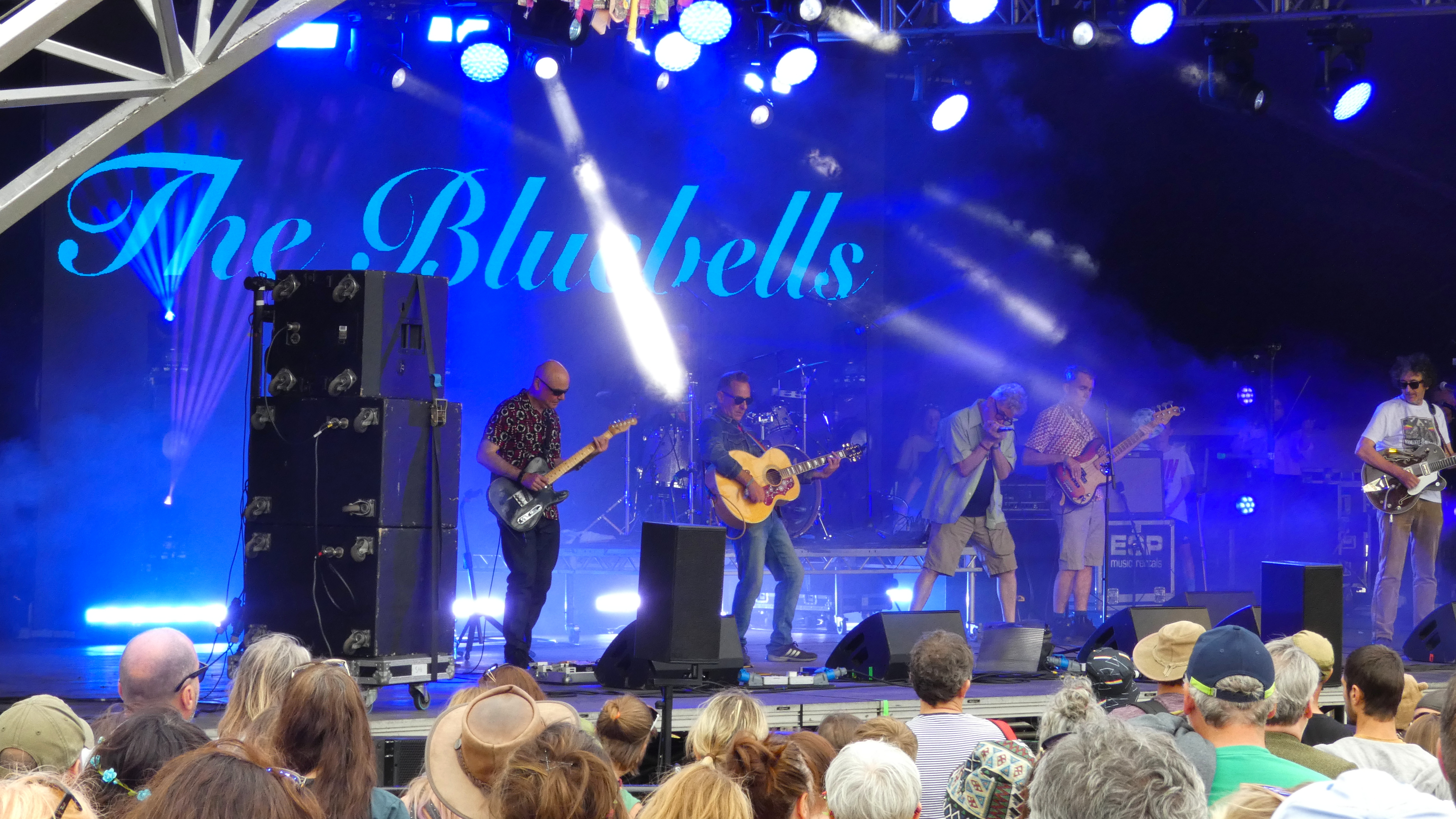
- The Bluebells at Doune the Rabbit Hole 2022

Background information
- Origin: Scotland
- Genres: Indie pop; new wave; jangle pop
- Years active: 1981–1986, 1993, 2008–2009, 2011, 2018, 2019, 2023–present
- Labels: London, Sire
- Members: Robert Hodgens; David McCluskey; Ken McCluskey; Lawrence Donegan; Craig Gannon; Neil Baldwin; Russell Irvine; Gary Crowley

The Bluebells are a Scottish indie new wave band, active between 1981 and 1986 (later reforming in 1993, 2008–2009, 2011, 2018, 2019 and 2023).

== Career ==
The Bluebells performed jangly guitar-based pop not dissimilar to their Scottish contemporaries Aztec Camera and Orange Juice. They had three top 40 hits on the UK Singles Chart, all written or co-written by guitarist and founder member Bobby Bluebell (real name Robert Hodgens) – "I'm Falling", "Cath", and their biggest success, "Young at Heart". The latter was co-written with Siobhan Fahey of Bananarama (the original version, recorded by Bananarama for their album Deep Sea Skiving, was also credited to the other members of that group) and violinist Bobby Valentino, and made it to number 8 on the UK Singles Chart on its original release in 1984. The band also released one EP, The Bluebells, and one full-length album, Sisters.

The band split up in the mid-1980s, but enjoyed an unexpected revival in 1993 when "Young at Heart" was used in a Volkswagen television advertisement. Re-issued as a single, it was number one for four weeks and led to the band reforming temporarily to perform the song on BBC Television's Top of the Pops. A compilation album followed, The Singles Collection, which peaked at No. 27 on the UK Albums Chart in April 1993.

The band reformed in late 2008, with original members the McCluskey brothers and Bobby Bluebell, to support Edwyn Collins at a show in Glasgow on 23 January 2009. On 29 May 2011, the band performed as part of the Southside Festival. On 17 December 2018, the band performed on a Christmas edition of The Quay Sessions for BBC Scotland. In 2019, the Bluebells appeared performing "Young at Heart" in an episode of the last series of the BBC Scotland sitcom Still Game.

The band released In the 21st Century, an album of new material in 2023.

== Post-Bluebells ==
Prior to the Bluebells achieving chart success, bass player Lawrence Donegan left to join Lloyd Cole and the Commotions; after that group split, he trained as a journalist, working for a time at The Scotsman and later as a golf correspondent for The Guardian. The other members of the band stayed in the music business after the split. David McCluskey and his brother Ken formed a folk duo, the McCluskey Brothers. Ken also works as a lecturer at Glasgow Kelvin College teaching music business, and David uses music therapeutically with a wide variety of people. Robert Hodgens has worked as a professional songwriter and formed a new group called The Poems, signed to the American label Minty Fresh.

== Band members ==
- Bobby Bluebell (born Robert Anthony Hodgens, 6 June 1959, Scotland) – guitar
- David McCluskey (born 13 January 1964, Hamilton, Scotland) – drums
- Ken McCluskey (born Kenneth McCluskey, 8 February 1962, Hamilton, Scotland) – vocals / harmonica
- Lawrence Donegan (born 13 July 1961, Stirling, Scotland) – bass
- Craig Gannon (born Craig Ian Gannon, 30 July 1966, Manchester, England) – guitar
- Neil Baldwin (born Neil Edward Baldwin) – bass
- Russell Irvine (born 28 March 1962, Johnstone, Scotland) – guitar
- Gary Crowley – guitar

== Discography ==
=== Albums ===
Title	Album details	Peak chart positions	
Title	Album details	UK	SWE
The Bluebells EP	Released: 1983; Label: Sire	—	—
Sisters	Released: 1984; Label: London, Sire	22	29
Second	Released: 1992 (Japan only); Label: Vinyl Japan	—	—
The Singles Collection	Released: 1991, 1993, 2005; Label: Deram, London Records, Warner Platinum	27	—
Exile On Twee Street (a collection of early recordings & demos)	Released: 2014; Label: Cherry Red, Vinyl 180	—	—
In the 21st Century	Released: 28 April 2023; Label: Last Night from Glasgow	97	—

=== Singles ===
Year	Title	Peak chart positions				Certifications	Album
Year	Title	UK	GER	IRE	NED	Certifications	Album
1982	"Forever More"	—	—	—	—		Non-album single
1983	"Cath"	62	—	—	—		The Bluebells EP
1983	"Sugar Bridge (It Will Stand)"	72	—	—	—		The Bluebells EP
1984	"I'm Falling"	11	—	26	—		Sisters
1984	"Young at Heart"	8	—	13	—		Sisters
1984	"Cath (Remix)" (re-issue)	38	—	—	—		Sisters
1985	"All I Am (Is Loving You)"	58	—	—	—		Non-album single
1993	"Young at Heart" (re-issue)	1	55	1	15	UK: Gold	The Singles Collection
2023	Gone Tomorrow	—	—	—	—		In the 21st Century
