= Fabulous Poodles =

British pre-New Wave band (1975–1980)

- Origin: United Kingdom
- Genre: New wave
- Years active: 1975–1980
- Labels: Private Stock; Pye; Epic
- Past members: Tony de Meur; Bryn Burrows; Bob Suffolk; Richie Robertson; Bobby Valentino

The Fabulous Poodles were a British pre-new wave band formed in 1975. Known for quirky stage antics, such as exploding ukuleles, as well as songs with funny lyrics, the Fabulous Poodles toured with Meat Loaf, Sha Na Na, Tom Petty, Bill Bruford and Chuck Berry (as backing band). They appeared on the Old Grey Whistle Test. The band released three albums between 1977 and 1979 on Pye Records.

== History ==
The Fabulous Poodles started out just as the Poodles. The original Fabulous Poodles consisted of Tony de Meur on lead vocals and guitar, Richie Robertson on bass and vocals, Bobby Valentino on violin, mandolin and vocals, Bryn Burrows on drums and Bob Suffolk on piano.

Many of the band's lyrics were written by John Parsons, an artist/poet, who wrote "Chicago Boxcar", about a hair cut, for de Meur to put music to. Suffolk recognised a possible hit and asked de Meur to join the band. The song was taken to Private Stock Records who released it as a single in connection with Dave Woods.

The Poodles began touring England and the continent. Bob Suffolk left the band and went on to design recording studios (Suffolk Studio Design) while the final line up settled down to life on the road with Parsons as van driver, road manager and warm-up act as the Blue Poodle on a unicycle, often with his Jack Russell dog, Nipper, who howled to the harmonica. Parsons designed all the promotional material and merchandise. In 1979 the Fabulous Poodles embarked on an American tour supporting such notable acts as the Ramones and Tom Petty and the Heartbreakers.

The Fabulous Poodles were very heavily influenced by such British 1960s acts as the Who and the Kinks. Their first album, Fabulous Poodles, was produced by John Entwistle, bassist for The Who, who also played eight-string bass on a few songs. Their second LP, Unsuitable, featured their two best known songs, "Mirror Star" and "Chicago Boxcar (Boston Back)" and was produced by Muff Winwood. In 1978 they undertook a UK tour with special guest Tom Sorahan. Their manager was Brian Lane, manager of Yes.

In 1979, the final album Think Pink was recorded and released, the title being the only lyrics to one of the songs, "Pink City Twist". Initial quantities of the album shipped with hugely outsized outer sleeves, 24 inches (60cm) on a side. In 1980 the Fabulous Poodles released their final single, "Stompin' on the Cat" b/w "Anna Rexia" and "Don't You Lie To Me". Bryn Burrows later joined Freur and was in the original line-up of Underworld.

== Discography ==
=== 1977: Fabulous Poodles ===
1. "The Ending" (de Meur, Parsons, Valentino, Robertson, Burrows)
2. "Doctor" (Bentley, Suffolk)
3. "Work Shy" (de Meur, Parsons)
4. "Bike Blood" (de Meur, Parsons)
5. "Rum Baba Boogie" (de Meur, Parsons)
6. "When the Summer's Thru" (de Meur)
7. "Rosie Pink" (de Meur, Parsons)
8. "Roll Your Own" (Mel McDaniel)
9. "Pinball Pin Up" (de Meur, Parsons)
10. "Mr. Mike" (de Meur, Parsons)
11. "Cherchez la Femme" (de Meur, Parsons)

Personnel

- Tony de Meur – guitar, lead vocals, harmonica
- Bobby Valentino – violin, backing vocals, mandolin
- Richie C. Robertson – bass, backing vocals
- Bryn Burrows – drums, backing vocals
- John Entwistle – eight-string bass guitar (tracks 2, 10, 11)
- Bob Suffolk – piano (tracks 6, 9)

=== 1978: Unsuitable ===
1. "Mirror Star" (de Meur, Parsons)
2. "Topless GoGo" (de Meur, Parsons)
3. "Chicago Boxcar (Boston Back)" (de Meur, Parsons)
4. "Oh Cheryl" (de Meur, Parsons)
5. "Toytown People" (de Meur, Parsons)
6. "Convent Girls" (de Meur, Parsons)
7. "B Movies" (de Meur, Parsons, Valentino, Burrows, Robertson)
8. "Tit Photographer Blues" (de Meur, Parsons)
9. "Third Rate Romance" (Smith)
10. "Mugs Game" (de Meur, Parsons, Robertson)
11. "Suicide Bridge" (de Meur, Parsons)

=== 1978: Mirror Stars (an American compilation of the first two British records) ===
1. "Mirror Star" (de Meur, Parsons)
2. "Work Shy" (de Meur, Parsons)
3. "Chicago Boxcar (Boston Back)" (de Meur, Parsons)
4. "Oh Cheryl" (de Meur, Parsons)
5. "Toytown People" (de Meur, Parsons)
6. "Mr. Mike" (de Meur, Parsons, Robertson)
7. "Roll Your Own" (Mel McDaniel)
8. "B Movies" (de Meur, Parsons, Valentino, Burrows, Robertson)
9. "Tit Photographer Blues" (de Meur, Parsons)
10. "Cherchez La Femme" (de Meur, Parsons)

=== 1979: Think Pink ===
1. "Man With Money" (P. Everly, D. Everly)
2. "Bionic Man" (de Meur, Parsons)
3. "Any Port In a Storm" (de Meur, Burrows)
4. "(Hollywood) Dragnet" (de Meur)
5. "Bike Blood" (de Meur, Parsons)
6. "Cossack Cowboy" (de Meur, Parsons)
7. "Anna Rexia" (de Meur)
8. "You Wouldn’t Listen" (de Meur)
9. "Suicide Bridge" (de Meur, Parsons)
10. "Pink City Twist" (de Meur, Valentino, Burrows, Robertson)
11. “Vampire Rock” (de Meur, Parsons)

=== 1995: His Masters Choice ===
This is a compact disc personal best-of compilation

1. "Mirror Star"
2. "Work Shy"
3. "Bionic Man"
4. "B Movies"
5. "Toy Town People"
6. "Pinball Pin Up"
7. "You Wouldn't Listen"
8. "Stompin' on the Cat"
9. "Mr. Mike"
10. "Cherchez La Femme"
11. "Talkin' Trash"
12. "Rum Baba Boogie"
13. "When the Summer's Thru"
14. "Rosie Pink"
15. "Man With Money"
16. "Bike Blood"
17. "Chicago Boxcar (Boston Back)"
18. "Anna Rexia"
19. "Suicide Bridge"
20. "Pink City Twist"
21. "Vampire Rock"

=== 2009: Mirror Stars / Think Pink ===
The two American albums were paired on a single CD released on the American Beat Records label (an imprint of Collectors' Choice Music).

A bootleg live album recorded in Hempstead, New York in 1979 entitled Radio Stars has also been circulating around collector's circles for a few years.

== Personnel ==
- Tony de Meur – lead vocals, guitar, harmonica
- Richie Robertson – bass, guitar, keyboards, backing vocals
- Bobby Valentino – violin, mandolin, guitar, backing vocals
- Bryn Burrows – drum, percussion
