= Kinda Kute =

Single by Joe Jackson

from the album I'm the Man
- B-side: "Geraldine and John"
- Released: 1980
- Length: 3:30
- Label: A&M
- Songwriter: Joe Jackson
- Producer: David Kershenbaum

Joe Jackson singles chronology
"It's Different for Girls" (1979)	"Kinda Kute" (1980)	"The Harder They Come" (1980)

"Kinda Kute" is a song by British singer-songwriter and musician Joe Jackson, which was released in 1980 as the third and final single from his second studio album I'm the Man (1979). Described as a "pop song" by Jackson, the song was written by Jackson and produced by David Kershenbaum. "Kinda Kute" failed to chart in the UK, but reached number 91 on Canada's RPM Top Singles chart.

== Lyrics and music ==
Drew Blakeman of The Tech explains that, in the lyrics of "Kinda Kute", "he already has the girl of his dreams instead of merely coveting someone else's." According to Blakeman, this represents a departure for Jackson lyrically, though Blakeman concludes "True to form, though, he won't dance with her for fear of 'making a fool of myself again.'"

At a 1980 concert, Jackson described the track as "a little pop song", while at another show he called it "a song you can dance to". Musically, the song is in line with the new wave style of the rest of the album. The track also features a piano solo played by Jackson. Toby Goldstein of High Fidelity notes that the solo "expos[es] one of [Jackson's] lesser acknowledged talents."

== Critical reception ==
On its release, Mike Gardner of Record Mirror considered "Kinda Kute" a "jolly rolling tune" but felt it "hasn't the edge to do more than creep into the lower reaches of the charts". He felt "Don't Wanna Be Like That" would have been a "better choice" as a single. David Hepworth of Smash Hits wrote, "It's good enough, jolly enough and assuredly catchy enough, but Jackson can make much slyer, more affecting records when he wants to, and without sacrificing any of the commercial appeal."

Robbi Millar of Sounds praised Jackson as "one of Britain's better songwriters", but felt "Kinda Kute" was "totally forgettable" and a "twee cut from a mediocre album". She noted that Jackson was "never the best at picking a single" and felt the song's "brand of jolly singalongability" failed to show Jackson and his band at their best. Peter Trollope of the Liverpool Echo described it as a "good album track" but one that "shouldn't have been [the] follow up" to "It's Different for Girls".

In a review of I'm the Man, Sal Caputo of the Courier News felt the song "sounds like a reworking" of Graham Parker's "Silly Thing". Sean O'Brien of the Rocky Mount Telegram considered both "Kinda Kute" and "It's Different for Girls" as "two of the best, freshest New Wave songs ever written". In a retrospective review, Mike DeGagne of AllMusic considered the track to be a "catchy serving of attractive pop".

== Track listing ==
7" single (UK release)

1. "Kinda Kute" - 3:30
2. "Geraldine and John" - 3:13

7" single (Canadian release)

1. "Kinda Kute" - 3:30
2. "It's Different for Girls" - 4:03

== Personnel ==
Joe Jackson Band

- Joe Jackson – vocals, piano, arranger
- Gary Sanford - guitar
- Graham Maby – bass, backing vocals
- Dave Houghton - drums, backing vocals

Production

- David Kershenbaum – producer
- Alan Winstanley - engineer
- Aldo Bocca - mixing engineer
- Neill King - assistant mixing engineer

Other

- Michael Ross, Sheila Rock, Lou Kish - photography

== Charts ==
Chart (1980)	Peak position
Canada RPM Top Singles	91
UK The Singles Chart (Record Business)	60
