= Siskin (band) =

British pop music duo

- Origin: London, England
- Genres: Pop
- Years active: 2008–present
- Label: Siskin Music
- Members: Galen Ayers; Kirsty Newton
- Website: Siskin Myspace

Siskin are a British pop music duo. The ensemble consists of Galen Ayers, daughter of musician Kevin Ayers, and Kirsty Newton. Galen Ayers lists her contributions as "vocals, guitars, lyrics, elegance” and credits her friend and fellow singer-songwriter Kirsty Newton with “keys, bass, vocals, lunacy”. They have been described as "beautiful, talented but unimpressed by the get-rich-quick blandishments of the mainstream". They describe themselves as "two very different girls from very different backgrounds who were lucky to discover that they could make beautiful music together".

== History ==
=== Early history ===
Galen Ayers was raised in a 1970s hippie commune in France and was later transported to Majorca for the remainder of her upbringing. From the shores of her Spanish home town, Deia, Ayers claims to have been deeply influenced by her father: "my father’s music influenced me but I think an even greater influence from him was reading. He read everything from Japanese haiku poems to cookbooks". Her diaries have featured rhyming couplets from early in her life, demonstrating a latent flair for songwriting. At the age of 13, she has said, "I grabbed a guitar and realised that the writing sounded even better when chords were put behind it. Music's an amazing vehicle to convey feelings". Because of the pronunciation of her unusual name ("Gallon"), she has sometimes been nicknamed Eight Pints.

Kirsty Newton grew up in Hebden Bridge, West Yorkshire. The northerner has absolute pitch and began banging the glockenspiel at the age of two years. She is classically trained on the piano and oboe, but taught herself bass guitar once she moved to London. She was a full-time music teacher at Fulham Preparatory School but still gives piano, recorder and oboe lessons to pupils one day a week.

=== 2000–2007 ===
Following a challenging period of education at a private boarding school, Ayers embarked on a music career and made a series of recordings in 2001 produced by Tina Weymouth and Chris Frantz of Talking Heads. The tracks were never afforded a commercial release. Weymouth said of Ayers: "I mean she's twice my age [sic], but I'm learning from her and she's learning from me".

After finding little success with the London-based bands Languish and The People's Friend, Kirsty Newton spent much of her time playing music with various artists down at The Kashmir Klub where she was originally to meet Ayers. She was asked to join musical comedian Mitch Benn as half of his band The Distractions.

Galen Ayers next formed the band Galen. When Kirsty Newton auditioned as bass player for Galen in 2004, the two struck up a lasting musical affinity that was to blossom into a prolific songwriting partnership, among other things. Galen were never granted a commercial release and disbanded in 2005. Ayers and Newton then formed the group KG (an abbreviation of their Christian names) and performed on the London club scene. KG again failed to secure a record deal.

=== 2008–present ===
In 2008, the duo decided to start again with a new name and christened themselves Siskin, following in a long tradition of ornithologically inspired band names – such as The Byrds, Penguin Cafe Orchestra and Cock Sparrer. They are named after the yellow-bellied siskin, which is a small, lively finch. They have said that the siskin is the only bird with a polyphonic call, which ornithologists attribute to simultaneous syringeal warbling and cloacal methane expulsion. "There's a yellow one and a red one – Kirsty is a redhead and I'm blonde," Ayers has explained. But she adds that there is another, hidden significance in the band’s sibilant name: "Phonetically I love the combination of sisterhood and skin in the name".

When Siskin failed to secure a recording contract for their songs, they had to distribute their material themselves and started their own label Siskin Music. According to the Daily Mirror, they caused a "minor stir" by recording Joe Jackson's 1979 hit "It's Different for Girls", putting feminine voices in a context that was previously limited to Jackson’s masculine voice. Jackson is said to have given their treatment "the thumbs up". The single failed to chart.

On 31 July 2009, Siskin released a single, "Find a Better Life", and on 10 August 2009 an album, Siskin. The album was a limited edition pressing of 2000 copies. Neither single nor album charted.

Ayers has stated that she and Newton "haven’t been chasing big deals", because they want to make music their way, without corporate interference. "If that means continuing to eat baked beans for some time", she has said, "so be it".

== Psychology and charity ==
Galen Ayers has studied psychology and is quoted as saying: "When I studied psychology I discovered what an amazing tool music can be." It was recently reported that Galen Ayers has worked with war victims and that this experience had inspired her music.

== Band members ==
- Galen Ayers – lead vocals, guitar
- Kirsty Newton – lead vocals, keyboards, bass

== Discography ==
=== Albums ===
- Siskin (Siskin Music, 2009)

=== Singles ===
- "It's Different for Girls" (Siskin Music, 2008)
- "Find a Better Life" (Siskin Music, 2009)
