= I'm the Man (Joe Jackson album) =

Studio album by Joe Jackson
- Released: 5 October 1979
- Recorded: March 1979
- Studios: TW Studios, Fulham, London
- Genres: New wave, post-punk
- Length: 38:03
- Labels: A&M; AMLH 64794; A&M/PolyGram Records; 214 794; A&M/Universal Records; 493 089 (2001 reissue)
- Producer: David Kershenbaum

Joe Jackson chronology
Look Sharp! (1979)	I'm the Man (1979)	Beat Crazy (1980)

Singles from I'm the Man
- 1. "I'm the Man" Released: September 1979; 2. "It's Different for Girls" Released: 30 November 1979; 3. "Kinda Kute" Released: 1980

I'm the Man is the second album by English musician Joe Jackson, released in October 1979. Released shortly after Jackson's breakthrough debut, Look Sharp!, I'm the Man saw Jackson continue the style of his earlier album. Singles from the album included "I'm the Man" and "It's Different for Girls", the latter of which was his biggest UK chart single, peaking at number five on the UK Singles Chart.

I'm the Man was re-released in 2001 with one bonus track, a live version of "Come On". "Come On" was originally released as the B-side to Jackson's single "I'm the Man", also issued in October 1979.

== Background ==
On the album cover, Jackson appears in the guise of a particular type of petty criminal known in the United Kingdom as a spiv, a character who, in Jackson's own words, "always wears a gross polka-dot tie and a pencil-thin mustache, and he's always trying to sell you a watch or something like that real cheap. I think people always want to put a label on what you do, so I thought I'd be one step ahead of them and invent one myself - spiv rock." Jackson later explained, that the spiv character is "a silly image that I thought appalling. It's not intended to be a new musical revolution."

The album was quickly recorded to follow up Jackson's successful debut album Look Sharp!. Shortly after Look Sharp's release, Jackson speculated, "Compared to the first album, I think it's a bit more mature. It's getting more interesting as it goes along. The band is getting stronger. I think the band is gonna amaze people on the next album". Since then, the album has been described by Jackson as "Part Two of Look Sharp!". He later said on his website,

This is really Part Two of Look Sharp! – it was released less than a year later. I don't know how I even had the time to write and record a slightly more mature record, but I think it is, and the best of the first three.

I'm the Man was also released as a 7" album (5 - 7" singles) in a package as 'The 7" Album' and included a poster.

John Rzeznik of the Goo Goo Dolls named the album as one of the ten albums that changed his life. Carol Decker of T'Pau similarly praised the album as one of her favourites.

== Singles ==
Jackson pushed for "I'm the Man" to be the leading single from the album, and professed bemusement when it failed to chart in the US or the UK. (It did reach the top 40 in Canada, peaking at #23.) The record label then decided on its own to release "It's Different for Girls" which went straight to the UK Top Ten. Jackson later confessed: "I was amazed when that one was a hit." The album's third single, "Kinda Kute", reached number 91 in Canada.

== Critical reception ==
Professional ratings
Review scores
Source	Rating
AllMusic	4.5/5 stars
The Encyclopedia of Popular Music	4/5 stars
Record Mirror	4/5 stars
(The New) Rolling Stone Album Guide	3.5/5 stars
Smash Hits	7½/10
The Village Voice	C+

The Christian Science Monitor called the music "crisp and sharp," writing that "Jackson continues his subtle satirization and serves notice he ... is not getting soft."

== Track listing ==
All songs written and arranged by Joe Jackson, except where noted. Produced by David Kershenbaum.

No.	Title	Length
1.	"On Your Radio"	4:01
2.	"Geraldine and John"	3:14
3.	"Kinda Kute"	3:33
4.	"It's Different for Girls"	3:43
5.	"I'm the Man"	3:58
6.	"The Band Wore Blue Shirts"	5:07
7.	"Don't Wanna Be Like That"	3:41
8.	"Amateur Hour"	4:05
9.	"Get That Girl"	3:03
10.	"Friday"	3:36

2001 reissue bonus track
No.	Title	Length
11.	"Come On" (Live version. Written by Chuck Berry)	3:29

== Personnel ==
Musicians

- Joe Jackson – vocals, piano, harmonica, melodica
- Gary Sanford – guitar
- Graham Maby – bass, vocals
- David Houghton – drums, vocals

Production

- Joe Jackson - arrangements
- David Kershenbaum - producer
- Alan Winstanley - recording engineer
- Aldo Bocca - mixing engineer
- Neil King - assistant mixing engineer
- Michael Ross - art direction
- Bruce Rae - cover photography

== Charts ==
Album

Chart (1979–80)	Peak position
Australia (Kent Music Report)	81
Dutch Albums (Album Top 100)	45
New Zealand Albums (RMNZ)	47
UK Albums (Official Charts)	12
US Billboard 200	22

Singles

Year	Song	Chart	Position
1979	"It's Different for Girls"	Ireland (IRMA)	#4
1979	"It's Different for Girls"	UK Singles Chart	#5
1979	"It's Different for Girls"	U.S. Billboard Hot 100	#101

== Certifications ==
Organization	Level	Date
CRIA – Canada	Gold	1 November 1979
CRIA – Canada	Gold	1 January 1980
BPI – UK	Gold	29 April 1980
