= Stranger than Fiction (Joe Jackson song) =

Single by Joe Jackson

from the album Laughter & Lust
- B-side: "Drowning"; "Jenny Jenny"
- Released: 8 April 1991
- Length: 3:40
- Label: Virgin
- Songwriter: Joe Jackson
- Producers: Joe Jackson; Ed Roynesdal

Joe Jackson singles chronology
"Blaze of Glory" (1989)	"Stranger than Fiction" (1991)	"Obvious Song" (1991)

"Stranger than Fiction" is a song by English singer-songwriter and musician Joe Jackson, released on 8 April 1991 as the lead single from his ninth studio album, Laughter & Lust (1991). It was written by Jackson and produced by Jackson and Ed Roynesdal.

== Critical reception ==
Upon its release as a single, Alan Jones of Music Week commented, "Lighter than his latter work, 'Stranger than Fiction' is oddly reminiscent of the Hollies. Probably not a hit, but a mouthwatering taster for Jackson's forthcoming album." Pan-European magazine Music & Media wrote, "His first Virgin release and what a smash song too! Jackson has returned to pop. The chorus will be whistled from every grocery shop to every petrol station all over Europe." Jane Downing of the Sunday Sun picked it as her "gem" of the week and commented, "Joe's a top rate artist but his singles don't do too well. But then again, neither [does] anything that's remotely melodic." Barbara Ellen of New Musical Express described the song as "not bad" but added that "yet another whirl around low-rent suburbia is not quite what the 'kids' are into at the moment".

Marcus Hodge of the Cambridge Evening News gave a mixed review, stating, "It's intelligently arranged, fresh and buoyant, but all the brass stabs and big production remind us that he's really from a different era." Andrew Hirst of the Huddersfield Daily Examiner felt it "lacks the tuneful sting to scratch too deep beneath its cheerfully witty veneer". Jon Wilde of Melody Maker was critical, calling it "sub-Costello gripe". Steve Duffy of the South Wales Echo awarded two out of five stars and commented, "Joe not at his jaunty best, apart from the odd line. This has a marked American (yawn) influence."

== Track listing ==
7-inch single

1. "Stranger than Fiction" - 3:40
2. "Drowning" - 5:09

12-inch single and UK CD single

1. "Stranger than Fiction" - 3:40
2. "Different for Girls" (New Recording) - 3:37
3. "Drowning" - 5:09

Cassette single (US release)

1. "Stranger than Fiction" - 3:40
2. "Jenny Jenny" - 2:44

== Personnel ==
- Joe Jackson – vocals, keyboards
- Tom Teeley – guitar
- Joy Askew – keyboards, backing vocals
- Graham Maby – bass
- Dan Hickey – drums
- Sue Hadjopoulos – drums, percussion

Production

- Joe Jackson – production (all tracks)
- Ed Roynesdal – production ("Stranger than Fiction" and "Drowning")
- Larry Alexander – engineering
- Bob Ludwig – mastering

Other

- Calef Brown – illustration
- Patrik Andersson – photography

== Charts ==
Chart (1991)	Peak position
Australia (ARIA)	119
Canada Top Singles (RPM)	79
Europe (European Airplay Top 50)	26
Netherlands (Single Top 100)	71
Germany (GfK)	53
UK Playlist Chart (Music Week)	41
