= Laughter & Lust =

Studio album by Joe Jackson
- Released: 29 April 1991
- Recorded: October–November 1990
- Studios: Dreamland (Hurley, New York); Electric Lady (New York City, New York)
- Genre: Pop
- Length: 51:22
- Label: Virgin
- Producers: Joe Jackson, Ed Roynesdal

Joe Jackson chronology
Stepping Out: The Very Best of Joe Jackson (1990)	Laughter & Lust (1991)	Night Music (1994)

Singles from Laughter & Lust
- 1. "Stranger than Fiction" Released: 8 April 1991; 2. "Hit Single" Released: 1991; 3. "Oh Well" Released: 1991

Professional ratings
Review scores
Source	Rating
AllMusic	3.5/5 stars
Rolling Stone	4/5 stars
Select	3/5 stars

Laughter & Lust is the 11th studio album by Joe Jackson, released in 1991. A year before, he left A&M Records, which soon released Stepping Out: The Very Best of Joe Jackson, which became a Top Ten hit in the UK. Jackson subsequently signed a recording contract with Virgin Records.

Music journalist Martin C. Strong states "Laughter & Lust was Jackson's most direct, accessible material in years, a welcome diversion from his constant experimentation".

== Background ==
The recording of Laughter & Lust was preceded by a five-week "workshop tour" in the US during September and October 1990. The tour, which was billed as "Joe Jackson's Workshop", included performances of songs to be recorded for the album as a way of testing the new material before an audience. Laughter & Lust was then recorded over the course of October and November 1990 at Dreamland Recording Studios in Hurley, New York. It was mixed at Electric Lady Studios in November and December 1990.

Laughter & Lust was Jackson's first album for Virgin, following his departure from A&M in 1990. Jackson and his band embarked on a world tour to promote the album, which began on 18 May 1991 in Münster, Germany, and ended on 20 September 1991 in Sydney, Australia. The latter show was filmed and released in 1992 as Laughter & Lust Live.

Jackson told the Sandwell Evening Mail in 1991, "It's an album of light and shadows. Most of the songs are about sex and other romantic entanglements. We've put a lot of thought and feeling into the new songs." He added to the Evening Standard, "It's about one-third autobiographical, I suppose. You have to put yourself, your own experience into it or it isn't convincing."

Laughter & Lust would be Jackson's last non-classical studio album until 2000's Night and Day II. Jackson recalled in 2003, "After the Laughter & Lust world tour, it all turned to shit, basically. I had real bad writer's block. I couldn't even listen to music. I just lost it, totally. It was awful." In a 1994 interview with Cash Box, Jackson said, "Laughter & Lust, I felt, was the closest thing I could possibly do to a commercial pop record that I thought everyone was gonna love. And it was not very successful in the States. It did okay in Europe, actually. So it wasn't a complete flop."

== Critical reception ==
On its release, Stephen Dalton of New Musical Express was negative in his review, commenting that Jackson is "not even interestingly bitter" and adding that he "present[s] these mundane mid-life moans as half-hearted social commentary that makes Phil Collins sound like Public Enemy."

== Track listing ==
All songs written and arranged by Joe Jackson, except where noted.

No.	Title	Writer(s)	Length
1.	"Obvious Song"		4:11
2.	"Goin' Downtown"	Joe Jackson, Drew Barfield	3:05
3.	"Stranger than Fiction"		3:40
4.	"Oh Well"	Peter Green	2:29
5.	"Jamie G."		2:04
6.	"Hit Single"		3:37
7.	"It's All Too Much"		4:22
8.	"When You're Not Around"		4:01
9.	"The Other Me"		4:11
10.	"Trying to Cry"		6:35
11.	"My House"		4:26
12.	"The Old Songs"		3:32
13.	"Drowning"		5:09

== Personnel ==
Musicians

- Joe Jackson – keyboards, vocals
- Joy Askew – keyboards, vocals
- Tom Teeley – guitars, vocals
- Graham Maby – bass, vocals
- Sue Hadjopoulos – percussion, drums
- Dan Hickey – drums

with:

- Tony Aiello – saxophones
- Annie Whitehead – trombone
- Michael Morreale – trumpet
- Charles McCracken – cello

Production

- Joe Jackson – arrangements, producer
- Ed Roynesdal – producer
- Larry Alexander – engineer, mixing
- Dave Cook – assistant engineer
- John Yates – assistant engineer
- Adam Yellin – mix assistant
- Scott Hull – digital editing
- Bob Ludwig – mastering
- Masterdisk (New York, NY) – editing and mastering location
- Melanie Nissen – art direction
- Inge Schaap – design
- Patrik Andersson – photography
- Calef Brown – lettering
- Bobbie Brown – make-up
- Kellie Kutsugeras – stylist
- Steven Jensen and Martin Kirkup with Direct Management Group – management

== Charts ==
Chart performance for Laughter & Lust
Chart (1991)	Peak position
Australian Albums (ARIA)	57
Canada Top Albums/CDs (RPM)	43
Dutch Albums (Album Top 100)	22
European Albums (Music & Media)	47
German Albums (Offizielle Top 100)	20
Italian Albums (Musica e dischi)	24
Swiss Albums (Schweizer Hitparade)	17
UK Albums (Official Charts)	41
US Billboard 200	116
US Cash Box Top 200 Albums	60
US AOR Albums (Radio & Records)	19
