= Nineteen Forever =

Single by Joe Jackson

from the album Blaze of Glory
- B-side: "Acropolis Now (Instrumental)"
- Released: 8 May 1989
- Length: 4:43
- Label: A&M
- Songwriter: Joe Jackson
- Producer: Joe Jackson

Joe Jackson singles chronology
"(He's a) Shape in a Drape" (1988)	"Nineteen Forever" (1989)	"Down to London" (1989)

"Nineteen Forever" is a song by British singer-songwriter and musician Joe Jackson, which was released in 1989 as the lead single from his eighth studio album Blaze of Glory. It was written and produced by Jackson. "Nineteen Forever" reached No. 4 on the US Billboard Modern Rock Tracks and No. 16 on Billboard Album Rock Tracks charts.

The song's music video was directed by Alex Proyas and was Jackson's first since 1982's "Steppin' Out". In line with the song's lyrics about aging rock stars, Jackson appeared in the video with a wig, make-up, prosthetic belly and lamé jacket. Jackson performed the song on his 1989 tour with the same costume and would dedicate the song to "all those rock bands on tour this summer after having retired several times".

== Critical reception ==
Upon release, Music & Media described the song as "intelligent pop" and Jackson's "best bet for a hit" since "Steppin' Out". Billboard considered the song a "straightforward, no-frills pop release". In a review of Blaze of Glory, Spin described the song as a "swinging pop anthem".

Park Puterbaugh of Rolling Stone commented: "Another theme [on Blaze of Glory] is the rise of rock & roll, its promises and failures. There [is] a sardonic song about the delusion of wanting to be "Nineteen Forever"." The Philadelphia Inquirer commented: "Nineteen Forever", his attempt at the big-backbeat Jersey sound, calls up a dreamy place, one that puts the sincerity of his vocal in question." Stephen Thomas Erlewine of AllMusic noted "Nineteen Forever" as being a "brisk, stylish pop song".

== Track listing ==
7" single

1. "Nineteen Forever" - 4:43
2. "Acropolis Now" (Instrumental) - 4:16

CD single

1. "Nineteen Forever" - 4:43
2. "Acropolis Now" (Instrumental) - 4:16

CD single (US promo)

1. "Nineteen Forever" (Early Fade) - 4:34
2. "Nineteen Forever" (LP Version) - 5:43

== Personnel ==
- Joe Jackson - lead vocals, harmony vocals, chorus vocals
- Tom Teeley - guitar, chorus vocals
- Vinnie Zummo - electric sitar
- Ed Roynesdal - Hammond organ, syntheiser
- Graham Maby - bass, chorus vocals
- Gary Burke - drums
- Chris Hunter - alto saxophone
- Tony Aiello - tenor saxophone, soloist
- Charles Gordon - trombone
- Michael Morreale, Tony Barrero - trumpet
- Drew Barfield, Joy Askew - chorus vocals

Production

- Joe Jackson - producer, arranger
- Ed Roynesdal - associate producer
- Joe Barbaria - engineer
- Thom Cadley - assistant engineer
- Bridget Daly - mixing assistant
- Bob Ludwig - mastering

== Charts ==
=== Weekly charts ===
Chart (1989)	Peak position
Australian Singles Chart	80
Canadian (RPM) 100 Singles Chart	59
Dutch Singles Chart	44
Finland (Suomen virallinen lista)	27
Italy Airplay (Music & Media)	9
US Billboard Album Rock Tracks	16
US Billboard Modern Rock Tracks	4
