= Down to London =

Single by Joe Jackson

from the album Blaze of Glory
- B-side: "You Can't Get What You Want ('Til You Know What You Want)"
- Released: 2 October 1989
- Length: 4:15
- Label: A&M
- Songwriter(s): Joe Jackson
- Producer(s): Joe Jackson

Joe Jackson singles chronology
"Nineteen Forever" (1989)	"Down to London" (1989)	"Blaze of Glory" (1989)

Music video
- "Down to London" on YouTube

"Down to London" is a song by British singer-songwriter and musician Joe Jackson, released in 1989 as the second single from his eighth studio album Blaze of Glory. The song was written and produced by Jackson.

== Background ==
"Down to London" is one of a number of autobiographical tracks from Blaze of Glory and was inspired by the early days of Jackson's music career in London. In an interview on VH1's New Visions in 1989, Jackson commented,

"The song is from the point of view of a teenager who's going to the big city for the first time. The songs on Blaze of Glory are loosely a journey through time from the perspective of someone who's getting older as it goes along. The song is the third on the album. To me, it's when I was about 17. It's an old story that's retold everyday – people going to the big city to seek excitement, fame or just a job. The ambivalence of the song, I think, is although it's your first exposure to that big city excitement, at the same time you're exposed to a certain amount of harshness. You can't afford to stay in a nice hotel, you're sleeping on someone's floor. There's an element of that, but on the whole I think the song is pretty positive."

== Promotion ==
The song's music video was directed by Julien Temple and produced by Amanda Temple for Limelight. During July 1989, Jackson and his band performed the song on The Arsenio Hall Show and Jackson also performed a solo piano version on VH1 New Visions.

== Critical reception ==
Upon its release as a single, David Giles of Music Week described "Down to London" as "a fine tribute to a 'rusty old town'." He noted how the production "has kept everything nice and simple, even leaving in some very hesitant entries by co-vocalist Joy Askew". He also praised Jackson for having "retained his bite and inventiveness where most of his contemporaries have blanded out". Andrew Hirst of the Huddersfield Daily Examiner wrote, "The harmonica interludes and spluttering brass almost save this song about the lure of London's bright lights from oblivion. Just don't try busking with it, Joe." Marcus Hodge of the Cambridge Evening News stated, "There's no mistaking a Joe Jackson record. He is the only performer who can make the swing of 1962 sound relevant in 1989. Sometimes his records have too much going on. This is again very busy, but still catchy."

In a review of Blaze of Glory, Robin Denselow of The Guardian picked "Down to London" as one of its "moments" and described it as "Sixties-style" which "echoes Buffalo Springfield's 'For What It's Worth'." David Okamoto, writing for the St. Petersburg Times commented: "...only the snappy 'Down to London' - which borrows its piano line from Marvin Gaye's 'I Heard It Through the Grapevine' - manages to strike a nostalgic chord." Kristin Faurest of The Courier-Journal felt "Down to London" was the album's "most irresistible number by far". He added, "[It] shuffles and scratches along to the tune of a wailing harmonica and the kind of melody that makes you thump your hand against the steering wheel in time." People singled "Down to London" as the "best tune" which "boasts bouncy piano chords and lyrics about making it as a rock star". In a retrospective review of the album, Stephen Thomas Erlewine of AllMusic praised "Down to London" as a "brisk, stylish pop song". In 2009, Glide Magazine ranked it as Jackson's 4th best song.

== Track listing ==
7" and cassette single

1. "Down to London" – 4:15
2. "You Can't Get What You Want ('Til You Know What You Want)" (Live) – 5:32

CD single

1. "Down to London" - 4:40
2. "You Can't Get What You Want ('Til You Know What You Want)" (Live) – 5:49
3. "Sunday Papers" (Live) – 5:12

CD single (US promo)

1. "Down to London" (LP Version) – 4:15

== Personnel ==
Down to London

- Joe Jackson – vocals, piano, fake harmonica
- Joy Askew – vocals
- Tom Teeley – guitar
- Chris Hunter – alto saxophone
- Tony Aiello – tenor saxophone
- Steve Elson – baritone saxophone
- Michael Morreale, Tony Barrero – trumpet
- Charles Gordon – trombone
- Graham Maby – bass
- Gary Burke – drums

Production

- Joe Jackson – producer, arranger
- Ed Roynesdal – associate producer and programming on "Down to London"
- David Kershenbaum, Joe Jackson – producers of "You Can't Get What You Want" and "Sunday Papers"
- Joe Barbaria – engineer
- Thom Cadley – assistant engineer
- Bridget Daly – mixing assistant
- Bob Ludwig – mastering

Other

- Stylorouge – design

== Charts ==
Chart (1989)	Peak position
Australia (ARIA Charts)	126
