= Obvious Song =

Single by Joe Jackson

from the album Laughter & Lust
- Released: 1991
- Genre: Rock
- Length: 3:40
- Label: Virgin
- Songwriter: Joe Jackson
- Producers: Joe Jackson; Ed Roynesdal

Joe Jackson singles chronology
"Stranger than Fiction" (1991)	"Obvious Song" (1991)	"Oh Well" (1991)

"Obvious Song" is a song by British singer-songwriter and musician Joe Jackson, which was released in 1991 as the second single from his ninth studio album Laughter & Lust. The song was written by Jackson, and produced by Jackson and Ed Roynesdal. The song's music video was directed by Marcus Nispel and produced by Marc Rosenberg.

== Background ==
As Jackson's US debut single for Virgin, "Obvious Song" was selected by the label as a track they believed would generate play on album, alternative and college radio. Diana Fried, product manager for Virgin, told Billboard of the label's decision to release it: "They felt Joe had had a long, illustrious career, but without a whole lot of radio successes in his recent past. To come out with a more pop single right off the bat might not be the best way to let the fans know he's got a new album out, and also might limit where we go with it." The song reached No. 2 on the US Billboard Modern Rock Tracks and No. 28 on Billboard Album Rock Tracks charts.

== Critical reception ==
On its release, Billboard described the song as "rebellious social commentary that gains credibility from the singer's distinctive phrasing." They added: "A ringing '60s style guitar arrangement combined with horns and piano lines make this rhythmically dynamic tune a must for modern and album rock formats." In a review of Laughter & Lust, John Everson of the Southtown Star wrote: "Kicking off with the wryly labeled "Obvious Song," Jackson spits out observations that are obvious, but seldom acted on."

Mark Lepage of The Gazette wrote: "When Laughter & Lust works, it is as brisk, invigorating, tuneful and concise as "Obvious Song"." Roger Catlin of the Hartford Courant commented: "The punchy "Obvious Song" and "It's All Too Much" are worthy rockers with pithy jabs." Parry Gettelman of the Orlando Sentinel considered the song to "perform the difficult task of combining social commentary and pop craftsmanship without sounding preachy or pretentious".

Elysa Gardner of Rolling Stone described the song as a "straight-ahead rocker" which "takes aim at an American rock star who drives around in a gasguzzling limo while preaching to a foreigner who makes his living by cutting down trees". People was more critical of the song, describing it as "preachy", with Jackson "com[ing] across as a swollen, whiny Billy Joel".

== Track listing ==
CD single (US promo)

1. "Obvious Song" (Edit) - 3:47
2. "Obvious Song" - 4:11

== Personnel ==
- Joe Jackson - vocals, keyboards
- Tom Teeley - guitar, backing vocals
- Joy Askew - keyboards, backing vocals
- Graham Maby - bass
- Dan Hickey - drums
- Sue Hadjopoulos - drums, percussion

Production

- Joe Jackson - producer
- Ed Roynesdal - producer
- Dan Hersch - editor on "Edit" version
- Larry Alexander - engineer
- Bob Ludwig - mastering

== Charts ==
Chart (1991)	Peak position
Canadian (RPM) 100 Singles Chart	68
US Billboard Album Rock Tracks	28
US Billboard Modern Rock Tracks	2
