= Kurzweil =

Kurzweil is a surname of German and Yiddish origin with the literal meaning "short while" or "short time" which in modern German only occurs as the adjective/adverb kurzweilig, meaning "entertaining" or "diverting". Notable people with the surname include:

- Adele Kurzweil (1925–1942), Austrian Holocaust victim
- Allen Kurzweil (born 1960), American writer
- Amy Kurzweil (born 1986), American cartoonist
- Arthur Kurzweil (born 1951), American genealogist, scholar of Judaism and writer
- Baruch Kurzweil (1907–1972), Israeli literary critic
- Edith Kurzweil (1925–2016), American writer and editor
- Jaroslav Kurzweil (1926–2022), Czech mathematician
- Max Kurzweil (1867–1916), Austrian painter and printmaker
- Ray Kurzweil (born 1948), American inventor, author and futurist
  - Kurzweil Music Systems, company founded by Ray Kurzweil that produces electronic musical instruments
  - Kurzweil Educational Systems, company founded by Ray Kurzweil that produces reading and writing software
