= Ronnie Golden =

British singer, guitarist and comedian (1948–2026)

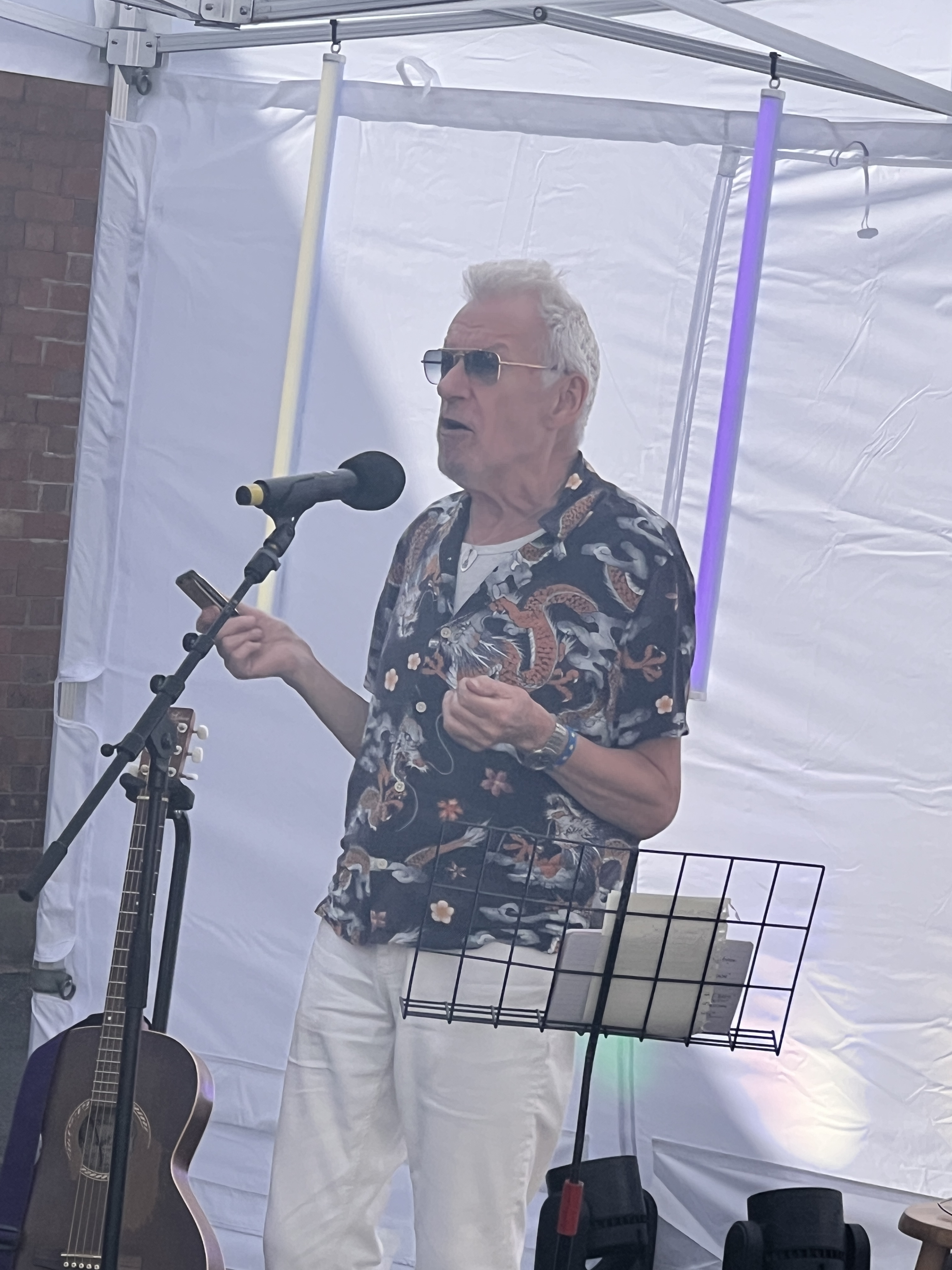
- Golden performing at the Rik Mayall Comedy Festival in 2026
- Born: Anthony John de Meur; 2 April 1948; Edmonton, London, England
- Died: 26 September 2026 (aged 78)

Anthony John de Meur (2 April 1948 – 26 September 2026), known professionally as Ronnie Golden, was a British singer, guitarist and comedian.

== Life and career ==
Anthony John de Meur was born in Edmonton, London, England on 2 April 1948.

He was the founder of the band The Fabulous Poodles. After the group broke up, he worked as a comedian as a member of The Comic Strip. From the early 1980s, he made many appearances at The Comedy Store and on the London alternative comedy circuit. Golden appeared in the second episode of the comedy series The Young Ones, hanging upside-down from the ceiling as Buddy Holly still in his parachute.

Golden fronted an R&B and soul group, Ronnie and the Rex. He also wrote songs and sketches for BBC Radio 4's The Right Time.

A long-time musical collaborator with Barry Cryer, Golden and Cryer performed at the Nine Lessons and Carols for Godless People show at The Bloomsbury Theatre and Hammersmith Apollo in December 2009. Cryer and Golden's performance was broadcast on BBC Four on 23 January 2010.

Golden died of a heart attack at his home, on 26 September 2026, aged 78.
