= Bobby Valentino (British musician) =

British musician

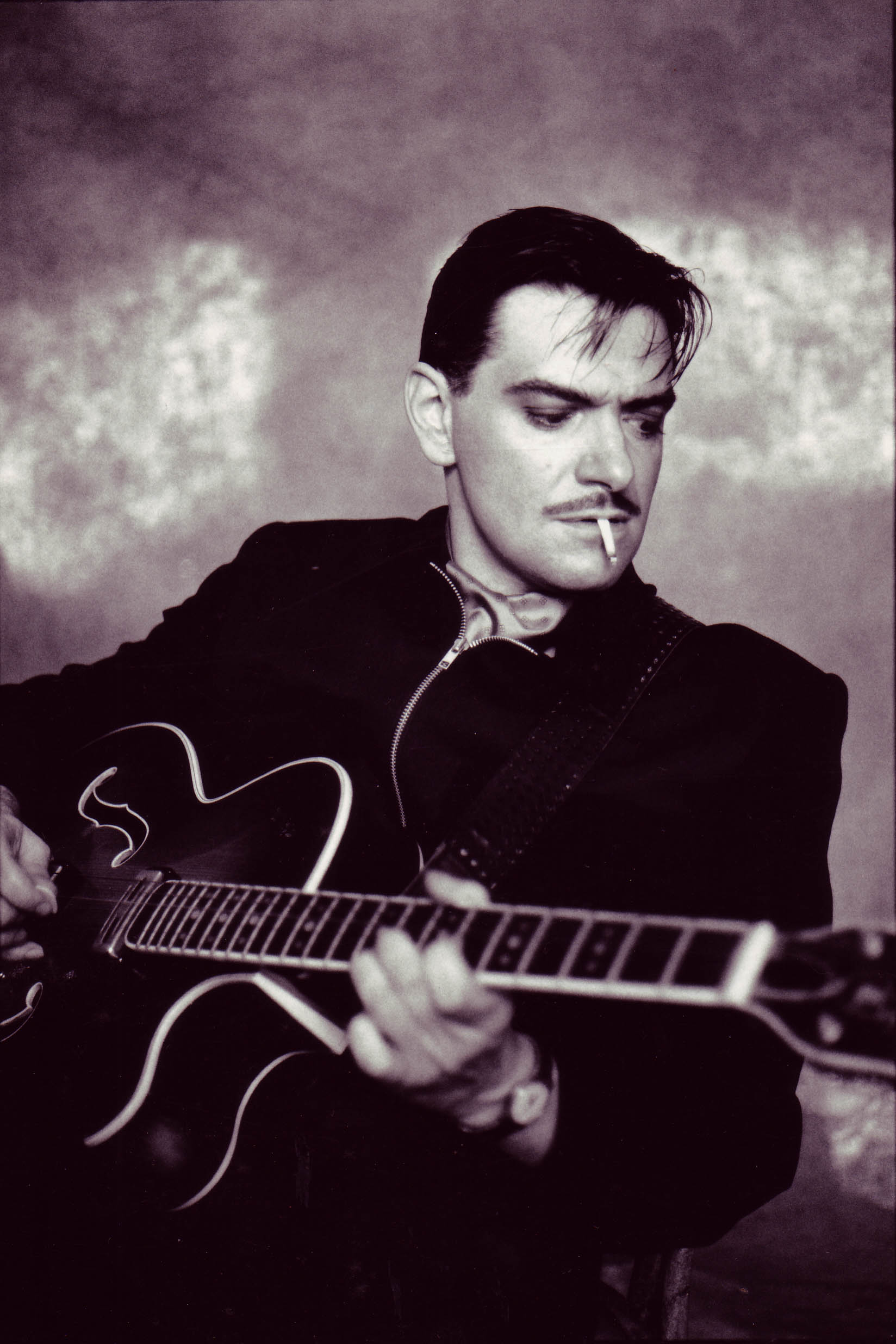
- Valentino in 1994

Background information
- Born: Robert James Beckingham; 22 June 1954 (age 72)
- Genres: Country; jazz; pop; rock
- Occupation: Musician
- Instruments: Violin; guitar
- Years active: 1974–present
- Formerly of: Fabulous Poodles; Los Pistoleros; The Bluebells
- Website: bobbyvalentino.co.uk

Bobby Valentino (born Robert James Beckingham, 22 June 1954) is a British musician and violinist.

== Career ==
Born in Chatham, Kent, he adopted the stage name Bobby Valentino in 1975. Valentino's first success was as a founding member of the Fabulous Poodles, but he is most often recognised as the violinist on the #1 hit single "Young at Heart" by the Bluebells, for which he was later credited as a co-writer.

After leaving the Fabulous Poodles in the early 1980s, Valentino was a member of the Electric Bluebirds before joining the Hank Wangford Band at the beginning of 1984. The British country band already included pedal steel guitarist B. J. Cole (Cochise) and former Liverpool Scene/The Scaffold/ guitarist Andy Roberts. Soon after joining the Hank Wangford Band, Valentino was performing with them in a pub when members of the Bluebells heard his playing, and asked him to join them in recording "Young at Heart".

In the five years that Valentino was part of Wangford's band they recorded three albums; filmed two TV series for Channel 4 – The A-Z of C&W and Big Big Country, which attracted audiences of between two and four million at a time when The Last Resort with Jonathan Ross was being watched by 750,000; performed and wrote an acclaimed and record breaking musical: C. H. A. P. S (Cowboy, Horseriding Acting Performance Studio) at the Theatre Royal, Stratford East (their previous record was held by Oh, What a Lovely War!); toured constantly all over the United Kingdom and Europe and made multiple other radio and television appearances. These included a TV special, Christmas in Strangeways showing the band in concert on Boxing Day with a captive audience in Manchester's Victorian jail.

Valentino's violin can be heard on tracks by artists including Tom Petty & the Heartbreakers, The Style Council ("My Ever Changing Moods")' Bob Geldof, the Alabama 3 and Shania Twain. He is also an occasional member of Mark Knopfler's current band. He has contributed to a number of recordings by the British folk punk band the Men They Couldn't Hang as well as frequently appearing with them on stage. His own most recent band, Los Pistoleros, sees him teamed up once again with former Hank Wangford bandmates B. J. Cole and Martin Belmont. Valentino is also a lead singer and guitarist in addition to playing the violin.

A part-time actor and model, Valentino has performed in West End musical theatre, such as in Destry Rides Again with Alfred Molina and Jill Gascoigne and in C.H.A.P.S. at the Theatre Royal, Stratford East. Occasionally he can be seen in films and commercials, usually taking the part of Clark Gable.

== Solo career ==
Valentino has released three solo albums.

You're in the Groove Jackson was recorded during 1990 in Livingstone Studios in Wood Green and GibsonWood Studios in Deptford and was released in 1991 on Big Life Records. The airplay was significant that some people thought he had had a hit but the distributors, Rough Trade Records went bankrupt the week it was due in the shops.

In 1996, You're Telling Me, which consisted of some new tracks and the best of You're in the Groove Jackson, was released by Vireo Records to critical acclaim and Valentino appeared at the 1996 South by Southwest music festival in Austin, Texas to launch the album. Again, the record company had distribution difficulties.

The 2001 release, This Is Murder, consisted of new tracks and previous recordings from the earlier recordings and appeared on E.M. Records.

All three titles are quotes from the Bob Hope and Bing Crosby film musical Road to Rio.

A fourth album was due for release in June 2011 under the title of Pat-a-Cake, Pat-a-Cake – another quote from Crosby and Hope.

Valentino is currently working on an album of new material with the working title of 6 ft 3ins.

== Legal actions ==
In 2002, Valentino won a court case against Robert Hodgens (a.k.a. Bobby Bluebell) of Scots pop band the Bluebells for unpaid royalties from his contribution to their 1993 hit "Young at Heart", co-written by Hodgens and Siobhan Fahey. Valentino's case hinged on convincing the judge that he, rather than Hodgens, had composed the song's distinctive violin part, and that the violin part made a significant enough difference to the song to be considered an original contribution. The song, first recorded by Bananarama in 1983, was then released by the Bluebells with the added violin part in 1984, reaching No. 8 on the UK Singles chart. Valentino was paid a session fee of £75. However his claim against Hodgens only dated back to the time of the single's 1993 re-release and chart-topping performance on the back of a high-profile Volkswagen TV commercial. The court case attracted media attention after Valentino performed the violin part in court to illustrate his point, convincing Justice Christopher Floyd to rule in his favour and award him damages of £100,000. A subsequent appeal by Hodgens against the ruling was unsuccessful.

In 2008, Valentino brought an action against the American R&B singer Bobby Wilson (then billed as "Bobby Valentino") and his then record label Def Jam for "passing off, trade mark infringement, and breach of contract, in relation to record sales, recorded content, and artist's live performances".

== Discography ==
- Alabama 3 – "Wade into the Water" (2000) Violin
- Alabama 3– "Power in the Blood" (2003) Violin
- Any Trouble – "Wrong End of the Race" (1984) Violin
- Big Country – "Eclectic" (1996) Violin
- Bluebells – The Singles Collection (1993) Violin
- Bluebells – "Sisters" (1984) Fiddle
- Blues Band – "Brand Loyalty" (1982) Violin
- Billy Bragg – "Talking with the Taxman About Poetry" (1986) Violin
- Bronski Beat – "Truthdare Doubledare" (1986) Violin
- Sam Brown – "Stop" (1988) Violin
- Cactus Rain – "In Our Time" (1990) Violin
- The Christians – "Colours" (1990) Violin
- B.J. Cole – "Heart of the Moment" (1995) Violin, Viola
- B.J. Cole – "Trouble in Paradise" (2004) Violin
- Andrew Cunningham – "20 Golden Greats" (1990) Violin
- Electric Bluebirds – "Back on the Train" (1996) Fiddle, Vocals
- The Fabulous Poodles – "Fabulous Poodles" (1977) Violin, Mandolin, Vocals
- The Fabulous Poodles – "Mirror Stars" (1978) Violin, Mandolin, Vocals
- The Fabulous Poodles – "Unsuitable" (1978) Violin, Mandolin, Vocals
- The Fabulous Poodles – "Think Pink" (1979) Violin, Mandolin, Vocals
- The Fabulous Poodles – "His Masters Choice" (1995) Violin, Mandolin, Vocals
- The Grants – "Let's Dance" (1998) Violin, Mandolin, Jaws Harp
- Haysi Fantayzee – "Battle Hymns for Children Singing" (1983) Violin
- The Ferns – "The Falling Trees" (1999) Producer, Violin
- Lena Fiagbe – "Vision" (1994) Violin
- Holly Beth Vincent – "Holly & the Italians" (1982) Violin, Mandolin
- John Illsley -" Never Told a Soul" (1984) Violin
- Jah Shaka/Mad Professor -"Jah Shaka Meets Mad Profes.." (1984) Violin
- Patricia Kaas – "Tour de Charme" (1993) Violin, Vocals
- Patricia Kaas – "Je Te Dis Vous" (1994) Violin
- David Knopfler – Release (1983) Violin
- Mark Knopfler "Quality Shoe" & "Baloney Again" (2003) Violin, Mandolin
- Gasper Lawal – "Abio'sun n"i (1985) Violin
- Les Rita Mitsouko – "Les Rita Mitsouko Presentent the..." (1987) Violin
- "Live in London Vol.1" (1984) Violin, Vocals
- Los Pistoleros – "Trigger Happy" (2001) Violin, Vocals, Guitar
- Los Pistoleros – "Cult 45" (2004) Violin, Vocals, Guitar
- Nick Lowe & His Cowboy Outfit -"Nick Lowe & His Cowboy.." (1984) Fiddle
- Kirsty MacColl – What Do Pretty Girls Do? (1998) Violin
- Andy McCoy – "R'n’R Memorabilia" (2003) Violin
- Mad Professor – "Who Knows the Secret of the Master" (1987) Violin
- Mad Professor – "Captures Pato Banton" (1988) Violin
- Mad Professor – "A Caribbean Taste of Technology" (1985) Violin
- The Men They Couldn't Hang – "How Green Is The Valley" (1986) Violin, arranger
- The Men They Couldn't Hang – "Waiting for Bonaparte" (1988) Fiddle
- The Men They Couldn't Hang – "Silvertown" (1989) Fiddle
- The Men They Couldn't Hang -"Majestic Grill: The Best of..." (1998) Violin, Arranger
- The Men They Couldn’t Hang – “Cherry Red Jukebox” (2003) Violin
- The Men They Couldn’t Hang – "Smugglers And Bounty Hunters" (2005) Violin
- The Men They Couldn’t Hang – "Devil on the Wind" (2009) Violin
- Amanda Norman-Sell – "As Love is My Witness" (1996) Violin
- Amanda Norman-Sell – "Patsy Cline Review" (1995) Violins
- Sinéad O'Connor – The Lion and the Cobra" (1987) Violins
- Mike Oldfield -"Earth Moving" (1989) Violin
- Tom Petty & the Heartbreakers – "Pack up the Plantation" (1986) Violin
- The Proclaimers – "Hit the Highway" (1994) Fiddle
- Red Box – "Circle & The Square" (1986) Violin
- Redlands Palomino Co. – "By the Time You Hear This…" (2004) Violin
- Reno Brothers – "Smile" (1996) Producer, Violin
- Andy Roberts – "Loose Connections" (soundtrack) (1984) Violin, Mandolin
- The Style Council – "My Ever Changing Moods" (1984) Violin
- The Style Council – "Cafe Bleu" (1984) Violin
- The Style Council – "Complete Adventures of the Style..." (1998) Violin
- Hank Wangford – "C.H.A.P.S." (1985) Fiddle, Mandolin, Vocals
- Hank Wangford – "Stormy Horizons" (1990) Fiddle, Mandolin, Acoustic Guitar
- Bobby Valentino – "You're in the Groove Jackson" (1991) Vocals, Violin, Guitar, Viola, Mandolin, producer
- Bobby Valentino – "You're Telling Me" (1996) Vocals, producer, Violin, Guitar, Mandolin, Viola,
- Bobby Valentino –"This is Murder" (2001) Vocals, Violin, Guitar, Mandolin, Viola, producer
- Luke Vibert & BJ Cole – "Stop the Panic" (2000) Vocals, Violin Mandolin
