= Collected (Joe Jackson album) =

Compilation album by Joe Jackson
- Released: 5 October 2010
- Recorded: 1979–2000
- Genre: New wave, rock, pop
- Label: Universal

Joe Jackson chronology
At the BBC (2009)	Collected (2010)	Live in Germany 1980 (2011)

Collected, released on 5 October 2010, is a compilation album from the British musician Joe Jackson, best known for his hits in the late '70s and well into the '80s. The album features hits and album tracks from all stages of his career plus a handful of live recordings on Disc Three. It includes the hits "Is She Really Going Out with Him?", "Steppin' Out", "Breaking Us in Two", "Nineteen Forever" and more.

== Track listing ==
All tracks are written by Joe Jackson, except where noted.

Disc One
No.	Title	Album	Length
1.	"Fools in Love"	Look Sharp! (1979)	4:23
2.	"Is She Really Going Out With Him?"	Look Sharp!	3:33
3.	"Look Sharp!"	Look Sharp!	3:23
4.	"Got the Time"	Look Sharp!	2:55
5.	"Sunday Papers"	Look Sharp!	4:22
6.	"It's Different For Girls"	I'm the Man (1979)	3:42
7.	"I'm The Man"	I'm the Man	3:58
8.	"On Your Radio"	I'm the Man	4:01
9.	"Get That Girl"	I'm the Man	3:03
10.	"Tilt" (taken from the single "The Harder They Come" (1980))		2:45
11.	"Biology"	Beat Crazy (1980)	4:31
12.	"Mad at You"	Beat Crazy (1980)	6:02
13.	"Beat Crazy"	Beat Crazy (1980)	4:15
14.	"One to One"	Beat Crazy (1980)	3:22
15.	"The Harder They Come" (written by Jimmy Cliff)	single (1980)	3:50
16.	"Jack, You're Dead" (written by Walter Bishop and Dick Miles)	Jumpin' Jive (1981)	2:46
17.	"Jumpin' Jive (1981)" (written by Cab Calloway, Frank Froeba and Jack Palmer)	Jumpin' Jive	2:41
18.	"Is You Is or Is You Ain't My Baby" (written by Bill Austin and Louis Jordan)	Jumpin' Jive	4:57
19.	"Five Guys Named Moe" (written by Jerome Bresler and Larry Wynn)	Jumpin' Jive	2:30
20.	"What's the Use of Getting Sober (When You're Gonna Get Drunk Again)" (written by Busby Meyers)	Jumpin' Jive	3:46

Disc Two
No.	Title	Album	Length
1.	"Another World"	Night and Day (1982)	3:53
2.	"Steppin' Out"	Night and Day	4:23
3.	"Real Men"	Night and Day	4:04
4.	"A Slow Song"	Night and Day	7:01
5.	"Breaking Us in Two"	Night and Day	4:53
6.	"Cosmopolitan"	Mike's Murder (1983)	4:36
7.	"1-2-3 Go (This Town's a Fairground)"	Mike's Murder	3:00
8.	"Laundromat Monday"	Mike's Murder	3:31
9.	"Cha Cha Loco"	Body & Soul (1984)	4:47
10.	"Be My Number Two"	Body & Soul	4:18
11.	"You Can't Get What You Want (Till You Know What You Want)"	Body & Soul	4:50
12.	"Happy Ending" (featuring Elaine Caswell)	Body & Soul	3:39
13.	"Not Here, Not Now"	Body & Soul	4:50
14.	"Will Power"	Will Power (1987)	5:52
15.	"(He's a) Shape in a Drape"	Tucker (1988)	2:59
16.	"Nineteen Forever"	Blaze of Glory (1989)	5:48
17.	"Down to London"	Blaze of Glory	4:14

Disc Three
No.	Title	Album	Length
1.	"The Human Touch"	Blaze of Glory	5:11
2.	"Me and You (Against the World)"	Blaze of Glory	4:14
3.	"When You're Not Around"	Laughter & Lust (1991)	4:01
4.	"Stranger than Fiction"	Laughter & Lust	3:40
5.	"Glamour and Pain" (featuring Dale De Vere)	Night and Day II (2000)	5:59
6.	"Happyland"	Night and Day II	5:12
7.	"Too Tough"	Rain (2008)	4:37
8.	"King Pleasure Time"	Rain	2:47
9.	"Come On" (live)
10.	"Right and Wrong" (live)
11.	"(It's a) Big World" (live)
12.	"Forty Years" (live)
13.	"Home Town" (live)
14.	"Is She Really Going Out With Him?" (live a capella)	Live 1980/86 (1988)	4:07
15.	"Jumpin' Jive" (live)
16.	"Summer in the City" (written by Mark and John Sebastian and Steve Boone)	Summer in the City (2000)	1:47
17.	"The 'In' Crowd/Down to London medley" (live, The 'In' Crowd" written by Bill Page)	Summer in the City	7:26
18.	"Stranger Than You" (live at 2 Meter Sessies)

== Charts ==
Chart (2010)	Peak position
Dutch Albums (Album Top 100)	48
