= This Is It! (The A&M Years 1979–1989) =

Compilation album by Joe Jackson
- Released: February 1997
- Recorded: 1979–1989
- Genre: New wave, rock, pop
- Length: 2:36:15
- Label: A&M Records
- Producer: Mike Gill

Joe Jackson chronology
Joe Jackson - Greatest Hits (1996)	This Is It! (The A&M Years 1979–1989) (1997)	Heaven & Hell (1997)

Professional ratings
Review scores
Source	Rating
Allmusic	4.5/5 stars

This Is It! (The A&M Years 1979–1989), released in February 1997, is a Joe Jackson compilation double album covering his period with A&M Records between the years 1979 and 1989.

Allmusic journalist Stephen Thomas Erlewine laments that the album does not include any material from Laughter & Lust -- released in 1991 on the Virgin Records music label -- but otherwise presents a comprehensive overview of Jackson's work. In his book The Great Rock Discography journalist Martin C. Strong awards the album 8 out of 10.

== Track listing ==
All songs written and arranged by Joe Jackson, except where noted.

Disc One
No.	Title	Album	Length
1.	"Is She Really Going Out with Him?"	Look Sharp! (1979)	3:33
2.	"Fools in Love"	Look Sharp!	4:23
3.	"One More Time"	Look Sharp!	3:15
4.	"Sunday Papers"	Look Sharp!	4:22
5.	"Look Sharp!"	Look Sharp!	3:23
6.	"Got the Time" (live album version)	Live 1980/86 (1988)	4:28
7.	"On Your Radio"	I'm the Man (1979)	4:01
8.	"It's Different for Girls"	I'm the Man	3:42
9.	"Don't Wanna Be Like That"	I'm the Man	3:41
10.	"Amateur Hour"	I'm the Man	4:05
11.	"I'm the Man"	I'm the Man	3:58
12.	"Tilt" (taken from the single "The Harder They Come" (1980))		2:45
13.	"Someone Up There"	Beat Crazy (1980)	3:47
14.	"One to One"	Beat Crazy	3:22
15.	"Beat Crazy"	Beat Crazy	4:15
16.	"Biology"	Beat Crazy	4:31
17.	"Jumpin' Jive (1981)" (written by Cab Calloway, Frank Froeba, Jack Palmer)	Jumpin' Jive (1981)	2:41
18.	"What's the Use of Getting Sober (When You're Gonna Get Drunk Again)" (written by Busby Meyers)	Jumpin' Jive	3:46
19.	"Is She Really Going Out With Him?" (live a cappella version)	Live 1980/86	4:07
20.	"Another World"	Night and Day (1982)	3:53

Disc Two
No.	Title	Album	Length
1.	"Breaking Us in Two"	Night and Day	4:53
2.	"Chinatown"	Night and Day	4:07
3.	"Real Men"	Night and Day	4:04
4.	"Steppin' Out"	Night and Day	4:23
5.	"A Slow Song"	Night and Day	7:01
6.	"You Can't Get What You Want (Till You Know What You Want)"	Body & Soul (1984)	4:50
7.	"Not Here, Not Now"	Body & Soul	5:27
8.	"Be My Number Two"	Body & Soul	4:18
9.	"Happy Ending" (featuring Elaine Caswell)	Body & Soul	3:39
10.	"Wild West"	Big World (1986)	4:37
11.	"Right and Wrong"	Big World	4:35
12.	"Home Town"	Big World	3:12
13.	"Precious Time"	Big World	3:23
14.	"Me and You (Against the World)"	Blaze of Glory (1989)	4:14
15.	"Down to London"	Blaze of Glory	4:14
16.	"Nineteen Forever"	Blaze of Glory	5:48
17.	"The Human Touch"	Blaze of Glory	5:11
