= Live 1980/86 =

Live album by Joe Jackson

Live album by Joe Jackson
- Released: April 1988
- Recorded: 1980–1986
- Genres: New wave, rock, pop
- Length: 109:41
- Label: A&M
- Producers: Joe Jackson, David Kershenbaum

Joe Jackson chronology
Will Power (1987)	Live 1980/86 (1988)	Tucker (1988)

Professional ratings
Review scores
Source	Rating
AllMusic	3.5/5 stars
Record Mirror	4/5 stars

Live 1980/86 is a Joe Jackson double live album, released in April 1988. It was recorded during the 1980 Beat Crazy tour, the 1982–83 Night and Day tour, the 1984 Body & Soul tour, and the 1986 Big World tour. Notably, the album contains three different versions of "Is She Really Going Out with Him?"

== Track listing ==
All songs written and arranged by Joe Jackson, except where noted.

The Beat Crazy tour (1980)
No.	Title	Length
1.	"One to One"	3:41
2.	"I'm the Man"	4:18
3.	"Beat Crazy"	3:59
4.	"Is She Really Going Out with Him?"	6:13
5.	"Don't Wanna Be Like That"	4:07
6.	"Got the Time"	4:28

The Night and Day tour (1982–83)
No.	Title	Length
7.	"On Your Radio"	4:56
8.	"Fools in Love"	7:14
9.	"Cancer"	7:31
10.	"Is She Really Going Out with Him?" (a cappella version)	4:07
11.	"Look Sharp!"	4:17

The Body & Soul tour (1984)
No.	Title	Length
12.	"Sunday Papers"	4:58
13.	"Real Men"	4:35
14.	"Is She Really Going Out with Him?" (acoustic version)	3:49
15.	"Memphis"	5:19
16.	"A Slow Song"	7:45

The Big World tour (1986)
No.	Title	Length
17.	"Be My Number Two"	2:43
18.	"Breaking Us in Two"	4:08
19.	"It's Different for Girls"	3:22
20.	"You Can't Get What You Want (Till You Know What You Want)"	5:32
21.	"Jumpin' Jive" (written by Cab Calloway, Frank Froeba and Jack Palmer)	2:29
22.	"Steppin' Out"	5:30

== Personnel ==
Musicians

- Joe Jackson – piano, synthesizer, organ, alto saxophone, harmonica, vocals

-- Performing on the Beat Crazy tour
- Graham Maby – bass, vocals
- Gary Sanford – guitar, vocals
- David Houghton – drums, vocals
-- Performing on the Night & Day tour
- Graham Maby – bass, vocals
- Joy Askew – keyboards, vocals, percussion on "Cancer"
- Ed Roynesdal – keyboards, vocals, percussion on "Cancer"
- Sue Hadjopoulos – percussion, vocals
- Larry Tolfree – drums, percussion
-- Performing on the Body & Soul tour
- Graham Maby – bass, vocals, tambourine
- Ed Roynesdal – keyboards, violin
- Vinnie Zummo – guitar, accordion, synthesizer on "Real Men", organ on "Slow Song"
- Tony Aiello – saxophones, piccolo, vocals
- Michael Morreale – trumpet, synthesizer on "Slow Song"
- Gary Burke – drums
-- Performing on the Big World tour
- Gary Burke – drums
- Rick Ford – bass, vocals
- Vinnie Zummo – guitar on "Breaking Us In Two" and "Steppin' Out"
- Tom Teeley – guitar, vocals on "It's Different For Girls", "You Can't Get What You Want" and "Jumpin' Jive"

Production

- Joe Jackson – arrangements, producer
- David Kershenbaum – producer
- Nigel Walker – recording engineer
- Caroline Orme – assistant recording engineer

== Charts ==
=== Weekly charts ===
Weekly chart performance for Live 1980/86
Chart (1988)	Peak position
Australian Albums (ARIA)	17
Canada Top Albums/CDs (RPM)	92
Dutch Albums (Album Top 100)	8
European Albums (Music & Media)	66
German Albums (Offizielle Top 100)	52
Italian Albums (Musica e dischi)	18
New Zealand Albums (RMNZ)	13
UK Albums (Official Charts)	66
US Billboard 200	91

=== Year-end charts ===
Year-end chart performance for Live 1980/86
Chart (1988)	Position
Dutch Albums (Album Top 100)	25
