= Sue Hadjopoulos =

American percussionist

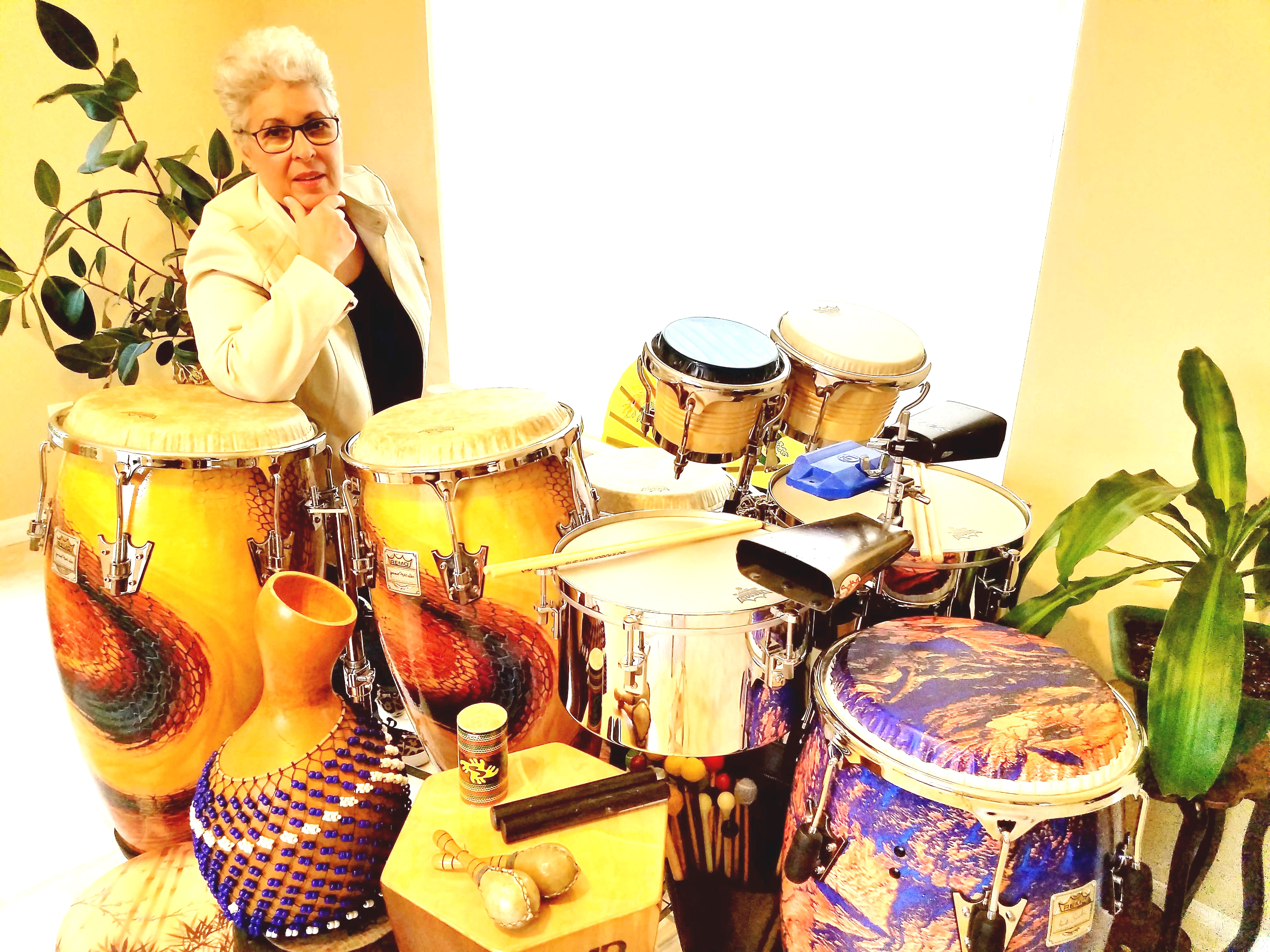
- Born: Flushing, New York, U.S.
- Occupations: Percussionist; Multi-instrumentalist
- Years active: 1977–present
- Musical career
- Genres: R&B; Jazz; pop; soul; Pop rock; Funk; Latin Pop
- Website: suehadjopoulos.com

Sue Hadjopoulos is an American percussionist.

== Early life and education ==
Hadjopoulos was born in Flushing, New York to a musical family. Her brother Chris Hadjopoulos is a drummer, and her brother Steve played flute, keyboards, and saxophone with the group Firefall from 1983 to 1988.

Hadjopoulos studied classical flute for six years before switching to drums and percussion. She graduated magna cum laude in anthropology at Barnard College, Columbia University and did her graduate studies at Mannes School of Music in Manhattan.

== Career ==
In 1977, Hadjopoulos began a two-year run as a founding member and timbalera of Latin Fever, a 14-piece female salsa band produced by Latin jazz pianist Larry Harlow.

In 1982, Hadjopoulos collaborated with British musician Joe Jackson to create his 1982 album Night and Day. Hadjopoulos continued her collaboration with him on-and-off through 2012; during that time she also toured with Cyndi Lauper, Simple Minds, Enrique Iglesias, The B-52's, and Ricky Martin, among others.

Hadjopoulos co-wrote, co-produced and performed the song "Breakin' Up" in the 1994 film Bar Girls. In the later 1990s and early 2000s, she also performed in theatre and off-Broadway shows such as Vicki: Behind The Beat with Vicki Sue Robinson in 1999. She also appeared in The Temptation of Saint Anthony world premiere at Ruhrtriennale festival in Duisburg, German and an off-Broadway production of Songs for a New World at Chernuchin Theater.

In 1984, she was voted one of the top five percussionists in the Latin/Brazilian category of Modern Drummer's Readers’ Poll.

== Discography ==
With Hazel Scott

- Always (1979)

With Joe Jackson

- Night And Day (1982)
- Mike's Murder (Soundtrack) (1983)
- Live 1980/86 (1988)
- Blaze of Glory (1989)
- Laughter & Lust (1991)
- Three of Hearts (Film Score) (1994)
- Heaven & Hell (1997)
- Symphony No.1 (1999)
- Night and Day II (2000)
- The Duke (2011)

With Simple Minds

- Once Upon A Time (1985)
- Live In The City of Light (1986)

With Laurie Anderson

- Strange Angels (1989)

With David Byrne

- David Byrne (1994)

With They Might Be Giants

- Factory Showroom (1996)

With Ricky Martin

- “I Count The Minutes” from Ricky Martin (1999)

With Michael Monroe

- Not Fakin’ It (1989)
