= Home Town (song) =

Single by Joe Jackson

from the album Big World
- B-side: "Tango Atlantico" (UK); "I'm the Man" (live) (US)
- Released: 1986
- Recorded: January 1986
- Genre: Pop rock
- Length: 3:12
- Label: A&M
- Songwriter: Joe Jackson
- Producers: David Kershenbaum; Joe Jackson

Joe Jackson singles chronology
"Right and Wrong" (1986)	"Home Town" (1986)	"Nocturne" (1987)

"Home Town" is a song by the British new wave musician Joe Jackson released on Jackson's 1986 live album, Big World. Written as an ode to his home of Portsmouth, "Home Town" was later released as the follow-up to his politically-charged single, "Right and Wrong". Despite its lack of chart success, the song has since attracted positive critical reception.

== Background ==
"Home Town," a song about the singer longing to return to his "home town," was written by Jackson as a nostalgic look-back on his childhood home of Portsmouth. Jackson said of the song, "'Home Town' was a deliberate exercise in writing a nostalgic song. It's not something I tend to indulge in that much. I think it turned out quite well". After performing the song in concert, Jackson joked, "That was a nostalgic song. I try to not write too many of those. But after a while, they're all nostalgic".

In the song's lyrics, Jackson sings from the perspective of a busy city worker who longs to leave his current standing and return to his childhood home, which he doesn't even know is still there. Musically, the song is a soft rock song featuring a clean guitar track.

In addition to its appearance on Big World, "Home Town" was released as a single in 1986, following "Right and Wrong." It was backed with the Big World track "Tango Atlantico" in Britain and a live version of "I'm the Man" in America. "Home Town" did not chart in either country. Jackson later described the song "Dave" off of his 2019 album Fool as being "in a similar vein to 'Home Town'".

== Reception ==
"Home Town" has since received positive reviews from critics. Upon its release as a single, Michael Pilgrim of Record Mirror praised it as a "thoughtful guitar-based twiddler that's low key throughout". Roger Holland of Sounds noted that the "nimble, sure-footed, reflective and almost provocative" track had been "pleasantly picked" from Jackson's "largely pallid live(ish) album". He added, "A not too clever-clever single from a man who often thrusts his cleverness right down your throat like a thick and furry tongue." Paul Taylor of the Manchester Evening News praised it as "another winner from Big World – one of the year's most exciting albums" and noted the "simple, twangy, sparse backing for a typically thought-provoking lyric". Alan Poole, writing for the Northamptonshire Evening Telegraph, stated, "Jackson has been quietly totting up the hits for several years now, and this latest single, as laidback and homely as the title suggests, should carve another notch." In the AllMusic review of Big World, Jason Damas said that it was one of "the best moments" of the album, citing it as a highlight of the album. The song was ranked number eight on Ultimate Classic Rock's list of the "Top 10 Joe Jackson Songs" by Dave Lifton, who said, "the nostalgic pull of a childhood, especially when the complexities of adulthood set in, is universal."

== Track listing ==
7-inch single (UK)

1. "Home Town" – 3:11
2. "Tango Atlantico" – 2:58

7-inch single (France and Spain)

1. "Home Town" – 3:11
2. "What's the Use of Getting Sober (When You're Gonna Get Drunk Again)" (Live) – 3:05

7-inch single (US, South Africa and Japan)

1. "Home Town" – 3:11
2. "I'm the Man" (Live) – 3:54

12-inch single (UK)

1. "Home Town" – 3:11
2. "Tango Atlantico" – 2:58
3. "What's the Use of Getting Sober (When You're Gonna Get Drunk Again)" (Live) – 2:58
4. "Steppin' Out" – 4:17

12-inch single (Spain)

1. "Home Town" – 3:11
2. "What's the Use of Getting Sober (When You're Gonna Get Drunk Again)" (Live) – 2:58
3. "Steppin' Out" – 4:17

== Personnel ==
Home Town

- Joe Jackson – lead vocals
- Vinnie Zummo – guitar, backing vocals
- Rick Ford – bass, backing vocals
- Gary Burke – drums

Production

- David Kershenbaum – production
- Joe Jackson – production
- Michael Frondelli – recording engineering

Other

- John Warwicker – design
- Laura Levine – photography

== Charts ==
Chart (1986)	Peak position
UK Singles Chart	185
US AOR Tracks (Radio & Records)	54
