= Zummo =

Zummo is a surname. Notable people with the surname include:

- Bethany Zummo (born 1993), American sitting volleyball player
- Frank Zummo (born 1978), American musician
- Peter Zummo (born 1948), American composer and trombonist
- Vinnie Zummo, American musician, producer, writer, arranger, and sound designer
