= Prince Hall Masonic Temple =

Prince Hall Masonic Temple may refer to:

- Prince Hall Masonic Temple (Los Angeles, California), listed on the U.S. National Register of Historic Places (NRHP)
- Prince Hall Masonic Temple (Baton Rouge, Louisiana), listed on the NRHP
- Prince Hall Masonic Temple (Manhattan), New York City, New York
- Prince Hall Masonic Temple (Washington, D.C.), listed on the NRHP
- Prince Hall Masonic Temple (Atlanta, Georgia), listed on the NRHP

== See also ==
- List of Masonic buildings
- Masonic Temple (disambiguation)
