= Happy Ending (Joe Jackson song) =

Single by Joe Jackson

from the album Body and Soul
- B-side: "Loisaida"
- Released: 20 April 1984
- Recorded: January 1984
- Studio: Masonic Hall (Manhattan)
- Genre: Pop
- Length: 3:39
- Label: A&M
- Songwriter(s): Joe Jackson
- Producer(s): Joe Jackson; David Kershenbaum

Joe Jackson singles chronology
"You Can't Get What You Want (Till You Know What You Want)" (1984)	"Happy Ending" (1984)	"Be My Number Two" (1984)

"Happy Ending" is a song by British singer-songwriter and musician Joe Jackson, which was recorded as a duet with Elaine Caswell and released in April 1984 as the second single from Jackson's sixth studio album Body and Soul. The song was written by Jackson, and produced by Jackson and David Kershenbaum. "Happy Ending" reached No. 58 in the UK Singles Chart. It also spent eight weeks on the US Billboard Hot 100 and was Jackson's fifth-highest and last song on that chart when it peaked at number 57 the weeks of August 11 and 18, 1984.

== Background ==
In a 1984 interview, Jackson discussed the song's sound and lyrical message,

"I always liked the idea of doing a duet, I always liked the idea of two voices trading off against each other. I had the idea that if I did [a duet], it should be a classic sounding sort of song, it should sound like a '60s kind of pop, boy-and-girl duet, but from an '80s perspective, and I think that's what this song is. On the face of it, it sounds like a bright, cheerful pop song about 'oh yeah, we're in love' and all that sort of thing, but in actual fact there's a lot of cynicism and disillusionment in it. It compares the relationship to like being in a movie. It's kind of like saying, 'well you know movies don't have happy endings anymore, people are suspicious of a movie that has a happy ending'. People seem to feel the same way about relationships and that's kind of what the song is about, and I tried to make it seem more sort of poignant by having it sung as a boy and girl duet."

== Critical reception ==
On its release, Frank Edmonds of the Bury Free Press gave the song a 7.5 out of 10 rating and commented, "Attractive male/female vocal sparring in a catch song, even if they do seem in a hurry to see the end of it."

Billboard described "Happy Ending" as "uptempo pop" that was in "middle ground between the spontaneous-sounding R&B of "You Can't Get What You Want" and the precise craftsmanship of Jackson's Night and Day hits." David Okamoto of The Tampa Tribune felt the song deserved to be a hit and described it as "wonderfully empty-headed boy-meets-girl love song in the '60s tradition".

In a review of Body and Soul, Steve Pond of the Los Angeles Times noted the song "rolls along at an infectious pace while tossing out echoes of the Ronettes along the way". Eleni P. Austin of The Desert Sun praised the song's "killer tenor sax solo" that "blends into a complete brass blast". She also added, "Caswell's voice is somewhat similar to Ronnie Spector's and it lends itself quite nicely to Jackson's breathy vocals".

== Track listing ==
7" single

1. "Happy Ending" - 3:39
2. "Loisaida" - 5:33

7" single (US promo)

1. "Happy Ending" - 3:39
2. "Happy Ending" - 3:39

12" single (UK release)

1. "Happy Ending" - 3:39
2. "Loisaida" - 5:33

== Personnel ==
Happy Ending

- Joe Jackson - vocals, alto saxophone
- Elaine Caswell - vocals
- Vinnie Zummo - guitar
- Ed Roynesdal - piano
- Tony Aiello - tenor saxophone
- Mike Morreale - trumpet
- Graham Maby - bass
- Gary Burke - drums

Loisaida

- Joe Jackson - piano
- Ed Roynesdal - synthesisers
- Vinnie Zummo - guitar
- Tony Aiello - alto saxophone
- Mike Morreale - flugelhorn, trumpet
- Graham Maby - bass
- Gary Burke - drums

Production

- Joe Jackson - producer, arranger
- David Kershenbaum - producer
- Rik Pekkonen - engineer
- Bernie Grundman - mastering

Other

- Melanie Nissen - cover design
- Charles Reilly - photography

== Charts ==
Chart (1984)	Peak position
Australia Kent Music Report	47
Belgium (Ultratop 50 Flanders)	40
Netherlands (Dutch Top 40)	34
Netherlands (Single Top 100)	19
UK Singles (OCC)	58
US Billboard Hot 100	57
US Cash Box Top 100 Pop Singles	61
