= Body and Soul (Joe Jackson album) =

Studio album by Joe Jackson
- Released: 14 March 1984
- Recorded: January 1984
- Studios: Masonic Hall (tracking); Vanguard Studios (control room); Atlantic Studios (mixing)
- Genres: Pop, Latin, jazz, sophisti-pop
- Length: 45:31
- Label: A&M
- Producers: David Kershenbaum, Joe Jackson

Joe Jackson chronology
Mike's Murder (1983)	Body and Soul (1984)	Big World (1986)

Singles from Body and Soul
- 1. "You Can't Get What You Want (Till You Know What You Want)" Released: 1984; 2. "Happy Ending" Released: 1984; 3. "Be My Number Two" Released: 1984; 4. "Cha Cha Loco" Released: 1984; 5. "The Verdict" Released: 1985

Body and Soul is the sixth album by English singer-songwriter Joe Jackson, released on 14 March 1984 by A&M Records. Jackson's first fully digital project, it peaked at No. 14 in the UK, while in the US it reached No. 20. Described by one reviewer as a sophisti-pop album, the tracks are a mix of pop, jazz and Latin music, showcasing the hit single "You Can't Get What You Want (Till You Know What You Want)". Two other singles fared well, with "Happy Ending" charting in five countries, and "Be My Number Two" enjoying moderate success in the UK.

The album artwork emulated the smoky jazz style of Sonny Rollins, Vol. 2 (1957). Musically, critics commended Jackson's introspective lyrics and dynamic arrangements, but one reviewer felt that Jackson and producer David Kershenbaum were not successful in their sonic goal of true-to-life minimalism. Jackson toured through August 1984 to promote the album, commenting afterward that he was exhausted from so much time on the road.

== Background and production ==
Producer David Kershenbaum met with Jackson about the project, first discussing it in mid-1983. Kershenbaum had "discovered" Jackson in 1978, and helped him produce 1979's Look Sharp! and I'm the Man albums. At the time of their meeting, Jackson was working to finish the soundtrack of Mike's Murder, and he told Kershenbaum he was weary of the artificiality of much modern music, recorded piecewise in dead acoustic isolation. He wished for a return to classic musicianship, with a well-rehearsed band playing together in the same space. Agreeing with him, Kershenbaum expressed a desire to move Jackson into the modern digital age, embracing the recent debut of the compact disc.

The soundtrack to Mike's Murder was released in September 1983, but the associated film was delayed because of a dispute between the director and the studio. Despite this setback, in December 1983 the soundtrack's single "Memphis" rose to No. 85 on the Hot 100, and the instrumental track "Breakdown" was nominated for a Grammy Award, the winner to be announced in late February 1984. While this was happening in late 1983, Jackson and Kershenbaum scouted potential locations for the Body and Soul recording sessions. Their aim was to find a reverberant performance space that was not "sterile" or lifeless. Jackson also began evaluating the album's material by performing the songs with his band in small clubs in New York, Pennsylvania and Connecticut.

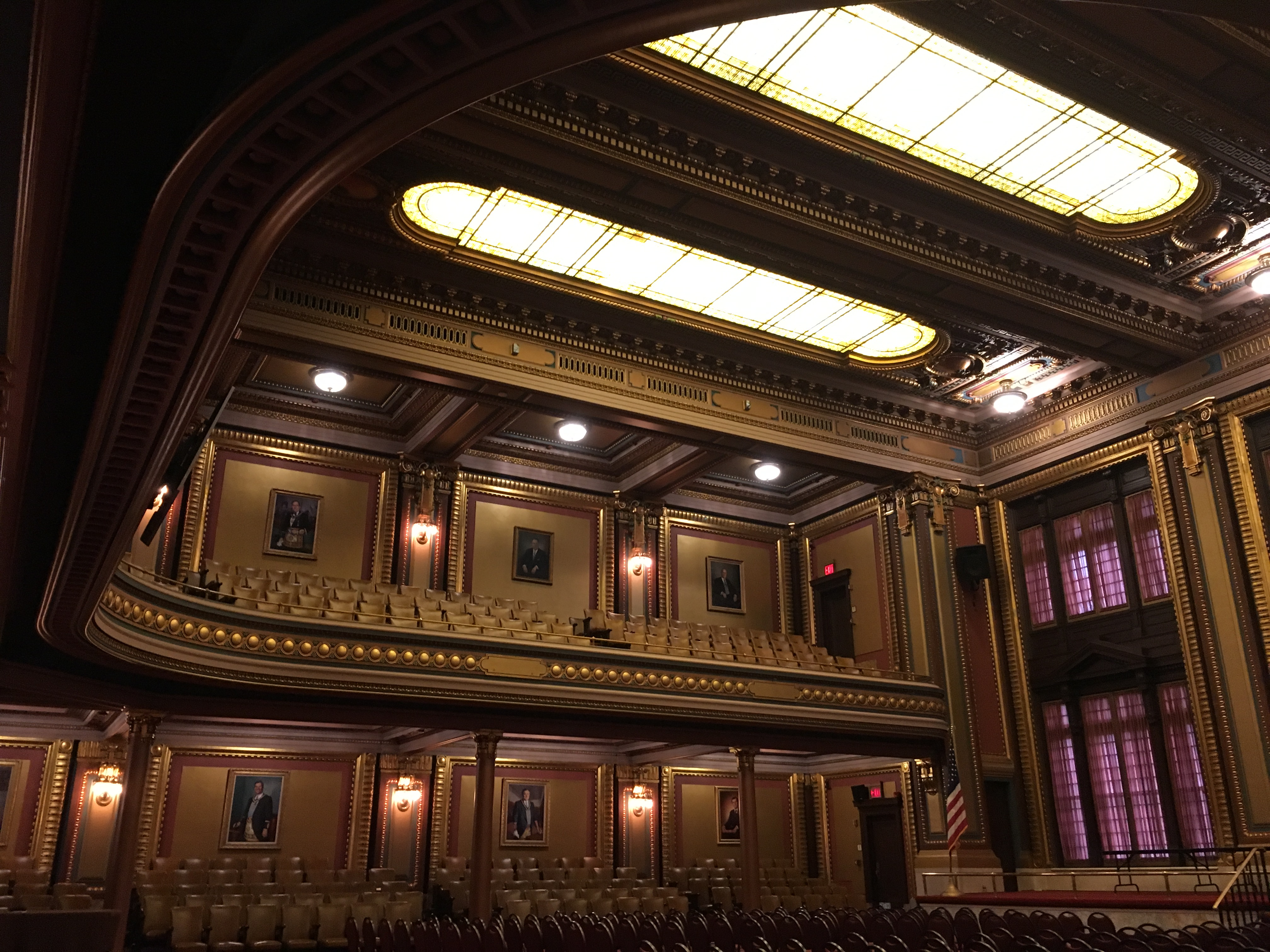
Grand Hall of the Masonic Hall

Kershenbaum and Jackson found the appropriate acoustics in Manhattan's Masonic Hall, which was next door to Vanguard Studios, and used by Vanguard for classical recordings. The hall's reverberant acoustics were captured by a matched stereo pair of expensive Neumann M50 microphones. Kershenbaum and Jackson set the band up to play together, with each instrument close-miked for individual focus as needed. To update Vanguard's equipment for a fully digital recording path, Kershenbaum oversaw the assembly of a new control room in an existing office at Vanguard, with wiring to connect to the Masonic. The initial tracking of the voices and instruments was laid down on a recently developed 3M 32-channel digital recording system. Most of the basic tracks were captured with the full band performing simultaneously, but for some songs the piano or the horn section was recorded separately, to get a cleaner mix. All the vocal parts were recorded separately, with Jackson backed by himself, Ellen Foley and Elaine Caswell; Caswell and Jackson sang as a duet on "Happy Ending". The musicians were at the Masonic for three weeks, then Jackson, Kershenbaum and Rik Pekkonen mixed the songs for a week at Atlantic Studios, and the completed master tapes were delivered by Bernie Grundman on 7 February 1984. Kershenbaum said that he and Jackson had intended to finish the project faster, but getting the digital gear together took extra time, and a total of five weeks for the album was "a step in the right direction" after earlier excesses.

== Artwork ==
In a nod to its jazz standards influence, the front and rear cover art imitated that of the 1957 saxophone album Sonny Rollins, Vol. 2, and the album's title was lifted from Coleman Hawkins' 1939 saxophone recording of "Body and Soul". Photographer Charles Reilly snapped the monochrome cover portrait of Jackson, he also framed a colourful two-shot of Jackson arm-in-arm with Caswell for the single release "Happy Ending", and he captured more monochrome images of Jackson used for the releases of "You Can't Get What You Want (Till You Know What You Want)" and "Be My Number Two".

== Tour ==
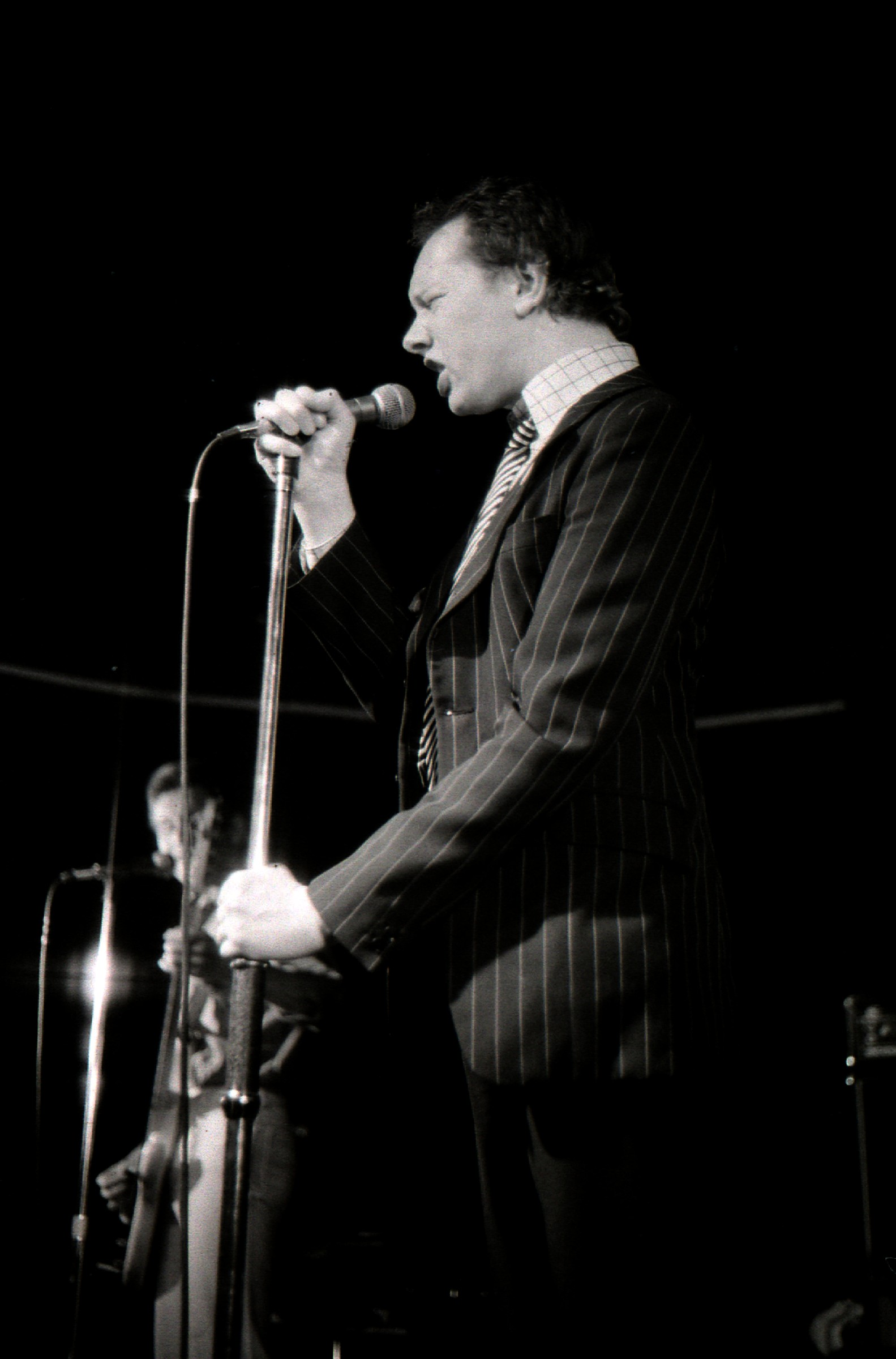
Jackson performing in 1979

Jackson embarked on a world tour to support the album. Starting in April 1984, he and his band spent five weeks travelling through Ireland, England, The Netherlands, Switzerland, Germany and France. Vocalist Elaine Caswell accompanied Jackson for this European leg, but the tour continued without her in the US and Canada, starting in mid-May and running for six weeks. Canadian journalist Ethlie Ann Vare caught the show at the Greek Theatre in Los Angeles, reporting that Jackson was "in an impish mood" on stage, refusing to play his older hits to satisfy repeated requests from some of the 6,000 attendees, and instead delivering an impromptu rendition of the pop classic "As Time Goes By" while the band watched. Vare praised Jackson's interpretations of songs from his last three albums, including "Memphis" from Mike's Murder which spotlighted drummer Gary Burke, and several songs from Night and Day (1982). One of the few older songs was "Is She Really Going Out with Him?" – Jackson's debut single – delivered surprisingly on accordion, piccolo and violin. The final encore was "Jumpin' Jive" from 1981. The band rested briefly for a week, then the schedule resumed in July–August with concerts in Belgium, Italy, Australia and Japan. At the end of this, Jackson took a lengthy break. The tour had been, he later wrote, "the hardest I ever did; it came too soon after the last one, and by the end of it I was so burned out I swore I'd never tour again".

== Musical style ==
"Loisaida"
The instrumental "Loisaida" features Tony Aiello carrying the theme on saxophone, accompanied by the band including Joe Jackson on piano. Toward the end, tinkling synthesizer chimes expand the piano texture into higher frequencies.

The album contains original pop songs written by Jackson, half of which were composed and arranged with a Latin flair. Latin elements heard on the album include salsa, cha-cha-chá, bolero, and instrumental canción. The musicians obtained Latin percussion sounds the same way they did live on stage, with Gary Burke emulating timbales on his normal drum kit, augmented by Ed Roynesdal on güiro and Tony Aiello on claves. Jazz elements are also found on the album, including instrumental solos such as Michael Morreale's haunting flugelhorn solo on "Not Here, Not Now", and Vinnie Zummo's bebop-style jazz guitar in "You Can't Get What You Want (Till You Know What You Want)", which followed a funk bass solo by Graham Maby. Soaring above Jackson's piano, Aiello played alto saxophone and Morreale played trumpet on the smoky jazz theme to "Loisaida", an instrumental tune evoking the nightlife of New York's Lower East Side. Stereo Review described "Loisaida" as "a mournful theme for sax and trumpet, which plumb the deepest lamplit sorrows while Jackson's piano chords flicker above like a starry night." Other styles on the album include post-disco on "You Can't Get What You Want", "Go For It"'s Motown-flavoured production, and the 1960s pop sound of "Happy Ending", modernised for the 1980s with Elaine Caswell singing the lyric "It's '84 now."

The first song on the album, "The Verdict", was inspired by the 1982 film The Verdict, featuring Paul Newman as an alcoholic attorney making good. Three tracks on the album showed Jackson's affinity for film music: "The Verdict", the atmospheric instrumental "Loisaida", and the closing cut "Heart of Ice" – the latter starting as an instrumental, building slowly in intensity, and joined by harmony voices in the final affirmation of acceptance and hope.

Writer Iain Munn wrote that Body and Soul was representative of a string of sophisti-pop albums that followed the Style Council's first release in 1983: Introducing The Style Council. Munn said that Jackson joined artists such as Simply Red, Sade and Everything but the Girl in releasing "jazz-soul"–flavoured pop songs in the wake of the Style Council's influential hit single "Long Hot Summer".

== Release and reception ==
Body and Soul was released in vinyl LP format on 14 March 1984. The compact disc was delayed until October; it carried the SPARS code "DDD" signifying an album that had been recorded, mixed and mastered digitally, without an intermediate analogue conversion. On 25 May, the LP peaked in the US at No. 20 on the Billboard 200, whereas in the UK the album rose higher sooner, peaking at No. 14 on 7 April, staying on the chart for 14 weeks.

Professional ratings
Review scores
Source	Rating
AllMusic	3.5/5 stars
Record Mirror	3/5 stars
Rolling Stone	4/5 stars

Three singles from the album charted in the UK: First "Happy Ending" hit No. 58 in April 1984, then "Be My Number Two" peaked at No. 70 in June, followed by "You Can't Get What You Want (Till You Know What You Want)" reaching No. 77 in September. In the US, "You Can't Get What You Want" hit higher at No. 15 in June, with "Happy Ending" trailing at No. 57 in August.

Rolling Stone's Don Shewey reviewed the album in May 1984, giving it four out of five stars. Shewey said the album demonstrated a maturation of Jackson's musicality, comparing him to Paul Simon and Randy Newman who shared an interest in "bridging the gap between pop music and serious music". Shewey was unhappy with the Motown-derivative song "Go For It", which he likened to an Elvis Costello track from the album Get Happy!! (1980). Shewey praised Jackson's hit song, "You Can't Get What You Want (Till You Know What You Want)", as "a bracing, sophisticated tune that successfully incorporates pop lyricism, a tight funk band and jazz compositional structures".

Stereo Review published a positive review characterizing the album as "intelligent romantic ballads that legitimize naked emotions." The reviewer noted Jackson's "affecting vocals, flickering piano chords, [and] honest lyrics". The instrumental tracks were praised for their arrangements, observing that some Latin jazz elements were carried forward from Jackson's 1982 album Night and Day. In a negative review, audiophile magazine The Absolute Sound called the album a sonic "disappointment" despite Jackson's flair for "acute lyrics and classy, dynamic arrangements." The writer focussed on the "failure" of Kershenbaum and Jackson in their quest to use minimal microphone techniques to highlight the natural acoustic space.

In retrospective reviews, AllMusic first assigned the album three stars out of five, publishing in the 2002 book All Music Guide to Rock. Chris Woodstra called out the song "Be My Number Two" as "beautiful". After AllMusic moved online, Mike DeGagne re-appraised the album at 3.5 stars in a 2008 review, describing it as "Jackson at his smoothest", delivering an album dedicated to exploring aspects of jazz.

== Track listing ==
All songs written and arranged by Joe Jackson. Produced by Joe Jackson and David Kershenbaum.

No.	Title	Length
1.	"The Verdict"	5:31
2.	"Cha Cha Loco"	4:47
3.	"Not Here, Not Now"	5:27
4.	"You Can't Get What You Want (Till You Know What You Want)"	4:50
5.	"Go for It"	4:18
6.	"Loisaida"	5:33
7.	"Happy Ending" (duet with Elaine Caswell)	3:39
8.	"Be My Number Two"	4:18
9.	"Heart of Ice"	6:53

== Personnel ==
Musicians

- Joe Jackson – vocals, acoustic piano, saxophone
- Ed Roynesdal – keyboards, violin, güiro
- Vinnie Zummo – guitars
- Graham Maby – bass
- Gary Burke – drums
- Tony Aiello – saxophones, flute, claves
- Michael Morreale – trumpet, flugelhorn
- Ellen Foley – backing vocals
- Elaine Caswell – backing vocals, duet on "Happy Ending"

Production

- Joe Jackson – arrangements, producer
- David Kershenbaum – producer
- Rik Pekkonen – engineer
- Dan Nash – mixdown assistant
- Frank Dickinson – digital recording system
- Bernie Grundman – mastering at A&M Studios (Hollywood, California)
- Jeremy Darby – production coordinator
- Quantum – layout, artwork
- Charles Reilly – photography
- John Telfer – management

== Charts ==
=== Weekly charts ===
Weekly chart performance for Body and Soul
Chart (1984)	Peak position
Australian Albums (Kent Music Report)	21
Canada Top Albums/CDs (RPM)	13
Dutch Albums (Album Top 100)	2
European Albums (Eurotipsheet)	7
German Albums (Offizielle Top 100)	21
Italian Albums (Musica e dischi)	16
New Zealand Albums (RMNZ)	8
Swedish Albums (Sverigetopplistan)	41
Swiss Albums (Schweizer Hitparade)	11
UK Albums (Official Charts)	14
US Billboard 200	20
US Cash Box Top 100 Albums	12
US AOR Albums (Radio & Records)	11

=== Year-end charts ===
Year-end chart performance for Body and Soul
Chart (1984)	Position
Australian Albums (Kent Music Report)	62
Canada Top Albums/CDs (RPM)	46
German Albums (Offizielle Top 100)	67
New Zealand Albums (RMNZ)	49
US Billboard 200	66

== Sales and certifications ==
Certifications for Body & Soul
Region	Certification	Certified units/sales
Netherlands (NVPI)	Gold	50,000^{^}
United Kingdom (BPI)	Silver	60,000^{^}
^{^} Shipments figures based on certification alone.
