= Tucker (soundtrack) =

Soundtrack album by Joe Jackson
- Released: August 1988
- Recorded: 1988
- Genre: Swing, jump blues
- Length: 44:25
- Label: A&M
- Producer: Joe Jackson

Joe Jackson chronology
Live 1980/86 (1988)	Tucker (1988)	Blaze of Glory (1989)

Professional ratings
Review scores
Source	Rating
Allmusic	2/5 stars

Tucker is a soundtrack album by Joe Jackson, released in August 1988 by A&M Records. It contains music for the Francis Ford Coppola film Tucker: The Man and His Dream. The album earned Jackson a Grammy nomination for Best Album of Original Instrumental Background Score Written for a Motion Picture or TV. This is Jackson's second soundtrack album following 1983's Mike's Murder.

== Track listing ==
All songs written, arranged and produced by Joe Jackson, except where noted.

No.	Title	Length
1.	"Captain of Industry (Overture)"	2:32
2.	"The Car of Tomorrow – Today!"	1:34
3.	"No Chance Blues"	2:30
4.	"(He's a) Shape in a Drape" (featuring Pete Thomas in tenor solo)	2:59
5.	"Factory"	1:08
6.	"Vera"	2:30
7.	"It Pays to Advertise"	0:41
8.	"Tiger Rag" (composed by Eddie Edwards, Harry De Costa, Larry Shields, Nick LaRocca, & Tony Sbarbaro)	2:09
9.	"Showtime In Chicago"	2:46
10.	"Lone Bank Loan Blues" (featuring Pete Thomas on saxophone)	1:11
11.	"Speedway"	2:40
12.	"Marilee"	3:03
13.	"Hangin' In Howard Hughes' Hangar"	2:37
14.	"Toast of the Town"	1:25
15.	"Abe's Blues"	2:42
16.	"The Trial"	6:46
17.	"Freedom Swing/Tucker Jingle" ("Tucker Jingle" music by Carmine Coppola)	1:38
18.	"Rhythm Delivery" (featuring Dave Bitelli in tenor solo)	3:24
Total length:		44:25

== Personnel ==
Musicians

- Joe Jackson – piano, synthesizer, percussion, saucepans, vocals
- Paul Sprong - trumpet (high notes)
- Raul d'Oliveira – trumpet (wah-wah mute)
- Pete Thomas – alto saxophone, flute, tenor solo on "Shape in a Drape"
- David Bitelli – tenor saxophone, clarinet, tenor solo on "Rhythm Delivery"
- Bill Charleson – alto saxophone, flute
- Tony Coe – solo clarinet, bass clarinet
- Rick Taylor – trombone
- Vinnie Zummo – guitar
- Dave Green – bass
- Gary Burke – drums
- Frank Ricotti – percussion
- Ed Roynesdal – Kurzweil synthesizer programming and sampling, solo violin
- Arlette Fibon – Ondes Martenot

Production

- Joe Jackson - arrangements, producer
- David Anderle – coordinator
- Gavyn Wright – string director and coordinator

== Charts ==
Chart (1988)	Peak position
Dutch Albums (Album Top 100)	99
