= Will Power (album) =

Studio album by Joe Jackson
- Released: April 1987
- Recorded: February 1986–January 1987
- Studios: RCA, New York City
- Genres: Classical, rock
- Length: 42:06
- Label: A&M
- Producer: Joe Jackson

Joe Jackson chronology
Big World (1986)	Will Power (1987)	Live 1980/86 (1988)

Will Power is the eighth album by Joe Jackson. Released in 1987, it is his first experiment with classical music, continued in later albums including Night Music, Heaven and Hell, and Symphony No. 1. Jackson was classically trained at the Royal Academy of Music, where he studied composition with Richard Stoker.

The album peaked at No. 131 on the Billboard 200 album chart.

== Critical reception ==
Professional ratings
Review scores
Source	Rating
AllMusic	2/5 stars
Robert Christgau	C+
The Encyclopedia of Popular Music	3/5 stars
MusicHound Rock: The Essential Album Guide	1/5 stars
Record Mirror	3/5 stars
The Rolling Stone Album Guide	2/5 stars
Sounds	1/5 stars

Reviews for Will Power were very mixed. Terry Staunton, writing for New Musical Express, described Will Power as an "accomplished project" which "highlight[s] [the] extremely talented Jackson as a composer and arranger". He questioned the album's commercial potential but added that it would "perhaps lead to a flood of film score commissions". Jane Wilkes of Record Mirror noted Jackson's diversity and said of the album, "You can call it pretentious, call it dramatic, but it's really rather relaxing at the end of the day." Neil Spencer of Sounds was negative in his review, calling it "nothing more than washed-out, dog-tired and depressing classical music of the lowest order" that "doesn't brutalise your brain with cantankerous clarinets; all it does is send you to sleep".

In the US, The New York Times called the album "a major step forward by an English composer and performer who has never remained in one place for long." While praising Jackson's compositional skill (including his "flair for lovely melodic passages and unpredictable, often shimmering arrangements" involving "stunning cascades of sound reminiscent of contemporary composer John Adams"), the Los Angeles Times also wrote that "the lengthy, meandering 'Symphony in One Movement' is as colorless and pretentious as the title suggests." Chris Woodstra of AllMusic retrospectively dismissed Will Power as "a good exercise in self-indulgence but little of anything else"; while Trouser Press described the album as "redolent with unrestrained pomposity... (a) trivial self-indulgence", commenting that "while Jackson may be impressed by his ability to convince an orchestra to play his melodramatically panoramic music, it’s unlikely anyone else will find this exercise especially rewarding."

== Track listing ==
All the tracks were written, orchestrated and produced by Joe Jackson. 'Will Power' was originally written as Overture for Two Pianos, for the French piano duo Katia and Marielle Labèque. 'Solitude' contains a quotation from the jazz standard (In My) Solitude by Eddie DeLange and Irving Mills. The Symphony in One Movement is a revised version of the orchestral score Jackson composed for the IMAX Japanese film Shijin No Ie (House of the Poet) in 1985, originally recorded by the Tokyo Symphony Orchestra. Jackson is the pianist on 'Nocturne'.

No.	Title	Length
1.	"No Pasaran"	6:07
2.	"Solitude"	9:37
3.	"Will Power"	5:52
4.	"Nocturne"	4:25
5.	"Symphony in One Movement"	16:14

== Personnel ==
Rhythm section

- Joe Jackson – acoustic piano (4), keyboard overdubs, percussion overdubs
- Pat Rebillot – acoustic piano (1, 2, 3, 5)
- Ed Roynesdal – electric piano, Kurzweil K250, synthesizer programming, sampling, sequencing
- Vinnie Zummo – guitars
- Anthony Jackson - bass guitar (2)
- Neil Jason – bass guitar (3)
- Gary Burke – drums
- Dave Carey – percussion
- David Freidman – percussion
- Sue Evans – percussion
- Andrew Zurcher – voice (2)

Orchestra

- David Nadien – concertmaster, contractor
- George Manahan – conductor

Horns and Woodwinds

- Tony Aiello – alto saxophone, soprano saxophone, clarinet solo (5)
- Chris Hunter – alto saxophone, tenor saxophone
- Steve Slagle – soprano saxophone (2)
- Laura Conwesser, Andrew Lolya and Michael Parloff – flute, piccolo
- Susan Trainer – piccolo (2)
- Ray Beckenstein, Roger Rosenberg, Charles Russo and Dave Tofani – clarinet, bass clarinet
- John Campo – bassoon
- Henry Shuman – oboe
- John Clark, Donal Corrado, Paul Ingraham and Jerry Peel – French horn
- Tom Malone and Dave Taylor – trombone
- Mel Davis and Michael Morreale – trumpet

Strings

- Seymour Barab, Diane Barrere, Alla Goldberg, Warren Lash, Jean Leblanc, Richard Locker, Charles McCracken, Jacqueline Mullen and Fred Zlotkin – cello
- John Beal, Homer Mensch, John Miller and Joe Tamosaitis – double bass
- Lamar Alsop, Julien Barber, Jean Dane, Maureen Gallagher, Sol Greitzer, Ted Israel, Carol Landon, Sue Pray and Harry Zaratzian – viola
- Marin Alsop, David Davis, Arnold Eidus, Lew Eley, Barry Finclair, Richard Henrickson, Regis Iandiorio, Jean Ingraham, Charles Libove, Louanne Montesi, Jan Mullen, David Nadien, John Pintavalle, Matthew Raimondi, Joseph Rabushka, Al Rogers, Richard Sortomme, Marti Sweet, Gerald Tarack, Marilyn Wright and Masako Yanagita – violin

=== Production ===
- Joe Jackson – orchestrations, arrangements, producer, mixing, sleeve design
- Michael Frondelli – engineer, mixing
- Paul Goodman – engineer, mixing
- Dennis Ferrante – additional engineer
- Laura Levine – photography
- Art Collins and Barry Taylor – management

== Charts ==
Chart performance for Will Power
Chart (1987)	Peak position
Australian Albums (Kent Music Report)	67
Canada Top Albums/CDs (RPM)	78
Dutch Albums (Album Top 100)	25
German Albums (Offizielle Top 100)	58
Italian Albums (Musica e dischi)	20
US Billboard 200	131
