= Prince Hall Masonic Temple (Manhattan) =

Coordinates: 40°49′51.09″N 73°56′30.99″W

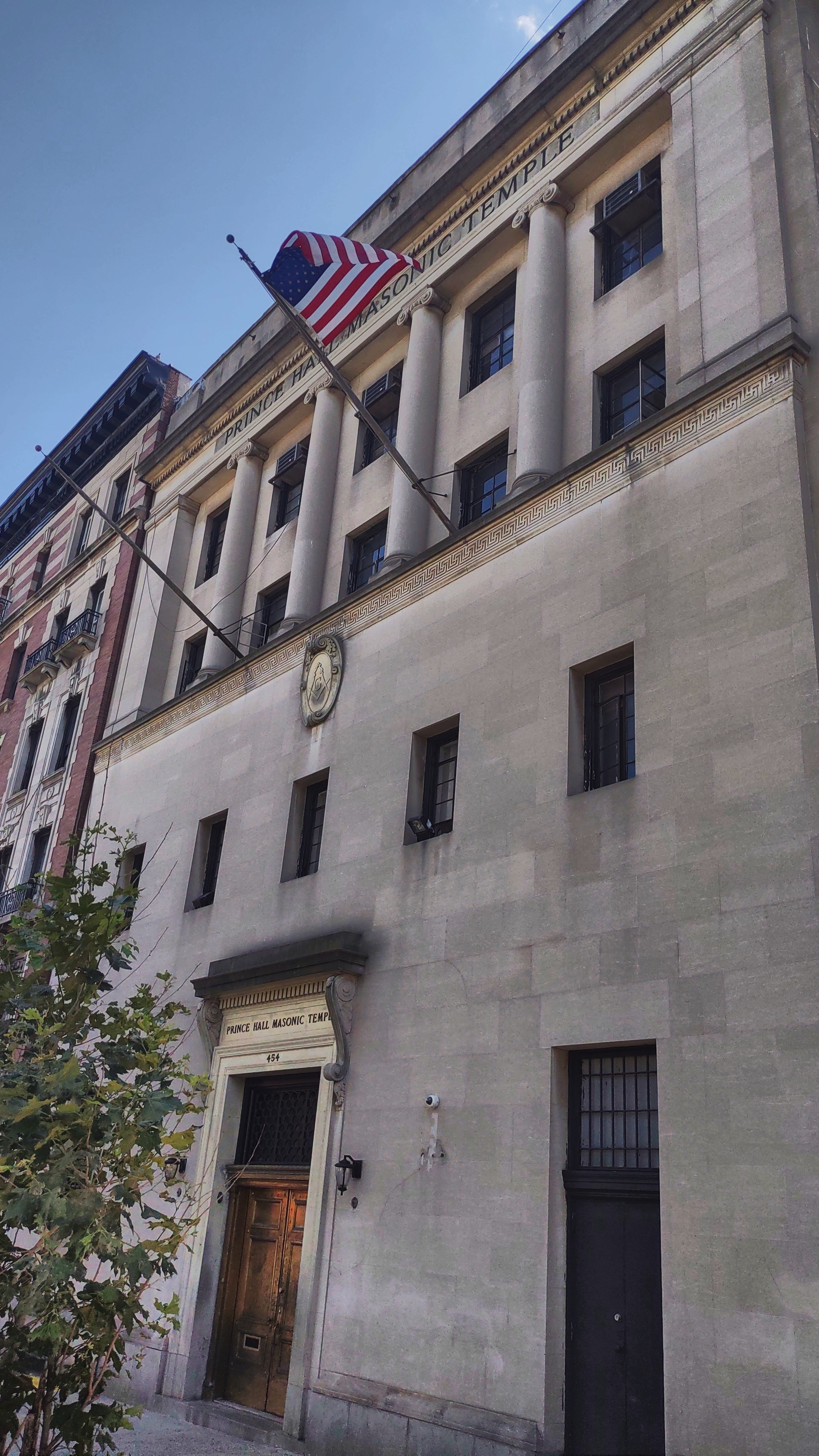

The Prince Hall Masonic Temple in Harlem, Manhattan in New York City, is a meeting place for Prince Hall Freemasons, located on 155th Street between Amsterdam and St. Nicholas Avenues.

Originally built from 1924 to 1925, it first served as the Masonic Temple for the William McKinley Lodge No. 840 of the Grand Lodge of New York. However, only 8 years later, in 1933, the Great Depression forced the lodge into bankruptcy, and it was repossessed by Branch Securities Corporation.

McKinley Lodge then met at the Grand Lodge of New York Building and later, in 1978, William McKinley merged with other lodges now known as Goldenrule Clermont McKinley Lodge 486.

Meanwhile, the building itself would pass from Branch Securities Corporation to Manufacturers Trust Company who leased the building to the Savage School for Physical Education in 1938. The Savage School was absorbed by New York University in 1943.

In 1944, the building resumed its Masonic use, as the state headquarters for the predominantly African American Prince Hall branch of Freemasonry.

The Prince Hall Foundation at this address with EIN 48-1304267 has status as a 501(c)(3) Private Nonoperating Foundation; in 2024 it had total revenue of $320,779 and total assets of $964,733.
