= Be My Number Two =

Single by Joe Jackson

from the album Body and Soul
- B-side: "Heart of Ice"
- Released: June 1984 (UK); September 1984 (US)
- Recorded: January 1984
- Studio: Masonic Hall (Manhattan)
- Length: 4:18
- Label: A&M
- Songwriter(s): Joe Jackson
- Producer(s): Joe Jackson, David Kershenbaum

Joe Jackson singles chronology
"Happy Ending" (1984)	"Be My Number Two" (1984)	"Cha Cha Loco" (1984)

"Be My Number Two" is a song by British singer-songwriter and musician Joe Jackson, released in 1984 as the third and final single from his sixth studio album Body and Soul. It was written by Jackson, and produced by Jackson and David Kershenbaum. "Be My Number Two" reached No. 70 in the UK and remained in the charts for four weeks.

== Background ==
Speaking to The A.V. Club in 2011, Jackson said of the song, "I would say it's a bit world-weary or, not world-weary, but a bit, how else to express this? Once bitten, twice shy. It's saying, 'Well, let's try again, but it's not going to be like it was the first time.' So it's poignant, I think."

== Critical reception ==
On its release as a single, Jerry Smith of Music Week wrote, "A slow ballad sung with feeling, mainly accompanied by piano until the band come in at the end with a warm fluid sax picking out the melody." Colin Davidson of the Evening Express described it as a "great choice as a single" and "poignant songwriting at its very best". Frank Edmonds of the Bury Free Press gave the song an 8 out of 10 rating and described it as a "quiet, plaintive, thoughtful and extremely attractive love ballad".

Sunie of Number One commented, "This is a pretty enough song, all tinkling piano and sad, cynical words. But it's not aimed at you or me. Divorce-scarred, mid-life Americans should lap it up." Billboard noted, "A quiet tune, except for the rousing finish; just Jackson, piano, and a tone of bewildered pathos."

In a review of Body and Soul, The Absolute Sound stated, "'Be My Number Two' is a song worthy of Jackson, a maybe-cynical, maybe-wise love song with a bit of hard-edged Fifties feel. This is the kind of song Jackson has always done well." The New Rolling Stone Album Guide of 2004 described the song as one which "hark[s] back to the incisive cynicism of Jackson's breakthrough albums".

== Track listing ==
7" single

1. "Be My Number Two" - 4:18
2. "Heart of Ice" - 6:53

7" single (UK limited edition)

1. "Be My Number Two" - 4:18
2. "Is She Really Going Out with Him?" - 3:34

7" single (US promo)

1. "Be My Number Two" - 4:15
2. "Be My Number Two" - 4:15

12" single (UK release)

1. "Be My Number Two" - 4:18
2. "Heart of Ice" - 6:53

== Personnel ==
- Joe Jackson - vocals, piano
- Vinnie Zummo - guitar
- Ed Roynesdal - keyboards, violin
- Tony Aiello - flute, saxophone
- Mike Morreale - flugelhorn, trumpet
- Graham Maby - bass
- Gary Burke - drums

Production

- Joe Jackson - producer, arranger
- David Kershenbaum - producer

Other

- Charles Reilly - photography

== Charts ==
Chart (1984)	Peak position
UK Singles (OCC)	70
