= Memphis (Joe Jackson song) =

1983 song by Joe Jackson

Single by Joe Jackson

from the album Mike's Murder
- Released: 1983
- Length: 4:44
- Label: A&M
- Songwriter(s): Joe Jackson
- Producer(s): Joe Jackson; David Kershenbaum

Joe Jackson singles chronology
"Cosmopolitan" (1983)	"Memphis" (1983)	"Moonlight" (1983)

"Memphis" is a song by English singer-songwriter and musician Joe Jackson, which was released in 1983 as a single from the soundtrack album of the American film Mike's Murder. The song was written by Jackson, and produced by Jackson and David Kershenbaum. It spent four weeks on the US Billboard Hot 100 and was Jackson's sixth-highest charted song in America when it peaked at number 85 the week of December 10, 1983.

== Critical reception ==
On its release, Cash Box wrote, "Jackson gives a rockabilly-voiced recounting of a disastrously funny journey to the city of his cultural roots." They considered the organ intro to be similar to that of the 1966 Spencer Davis Group song "Gimme Some Lovin'" and the bass line to be the same as Jackson's 1982 hit "Steppin' Out". In a review of Mike's Murder, Brett Milano of The Boston Globe felt the song "recalls the punkish sound of Jackson's early albums" and also drew similarities between the song's organ riff and "Gimme Some Lovin'".

John Laycock of the Windsor Star stated that the song "consciously steals several musical references, especially the famous organ riff straight out of 'Gimme Some Lovin'.'" Gary Graff of the Detroit Free Press identified further musical similarities and stated that Jackson uses "Memphis" as a "tossing ground for licks" from the Spencer Davis Group's "I'm a Man", the Ventures' "Wipe Out" and the Steve Miller Band's "Living in the U.S.A." Jim Zebora of the Record-Journal noted the similarity to "Steppin' Out", writing, "If you can tell this song from 'Steppin' Out' with your eyes closed, you can probably do the same with identical twins."

== Track listing ==
7-inch single

1. "Memphis" - 4:44
2. "Laundromat Monday" - 3:31

7-inch single (US/Canada release)

1. "Memphis" - 4:44
2. "Breakdown" - 3:59

7-inch single (US promo)

1. "Memphis" - 4:44
2. "Memphis" - 4:44

12-inch single (Spanish release)

1. "Memphis" - 4:44
2. "Laundromat Monday" - 3:31
3. "Moonlight Theme" - 3:25

== Personnel ==
Production

- Joe Jackson – producer and arranger (all tracks)
- David Kershenbaum – producer of "Memphis"
- Brad Leigh – engineer
- Larry Franke – assistant engineer
- Phil Jamtaas – remix engineer
- David Bianco – assistant remix engineer

== Charts ==
Chart (1983)	Peak position
US Billboard Hot 100	85
