= Big World =

Live album by Joe Jackson
- Released: 24 March 1986
- Recorded: 22–25 January 1986 (except "Man in the Street" recorded in rehearsals on 22 January)
- Venues: Roundabout Theatre, East 17th Street, New York City
- Genre: Pop rock
- Length: 60:47
- Label: A&M
- Producers: David Kershenbaum, Joe Jackson

Joe Jackson chronology
Body and Soul (1984)	Big World (1986)	Will Power (1987)

Professional ratings
Review scores
Source	Rating
Allmusic	4/5 stars
Sounds	2 7/8 out of 5

Big World is a 1986 live album of original songs by Joe Jackson. The album was recorded in front of an invited audience at the Roundabout Theatre, East 17th Street in New York City on 23, 24 and 25 January 1986 (except "Man in the Street", recorded during rehearsals on 22 January). The songs are loosely linked by lyrics covering a general theme of post-World War II international relations and global travel.

== Production ==
Jackson's intent for the recording was to capture the intensity and spontaneity of a live performance, but without the distraction of noise from the crowd. He requested that the audience remain silent while the performances of his band were recorded.

Unlike most other pop music recordings, which use multitrack recording techniques, no post-recording mixing or overdubbing was performed on the album. The music was mixed live from microphones on each musical instrument, then sent directly to a two track stereo digital tape recorder.

Regarding the album, Joe says: ‘I want to clear up two myths about this record which still crop up all the time. Myth 1: During the live recording of the album, the audience was forbidden to applaud. Fact: There was plenty of applause. We were just playing a lot of unfamiliar material, and recording it for an album, so the audience were asked to hold it until they were sure a song was finished. They understood this and there was no problem. Myth 2: It’s a double album with a side missing. Fact: This was my first album to be released on CD, where the running time was not an issue. I was having a hard time deciding what to leave out for the LP, though, and I suggested making a 3-sided one, and selling it for the price of a regular album. Much to my surprise, the record company said yes. So rather than a side missing, you got an extra side. Critics, of course, hadn’t had to pay for it.’

== Release ==
The LP release was a double album, but only three sides had music. The fourth side label stated "there is no music on this side", and the record had a groove containing approximately 30 seconds of silence that quickly led to the inner to prevent stylus damage. The CD release contained the same 15 tracks on one disc.

The front cover of the album (work by Serge Clerc) features the phrase "Big World" in French, Persian, Mandarin Chinese, Greek, Dutch, Korean, Thai, Russian, Irish Gaelic, Armenian, Hindi, English, Hebrew, Indonesian, Arabic, and Polish. The back cover features the same phrase in Vietnamese, Swedish, Swiss German, Turkish, Spanish, Swahili, Italian, Danish, Finnish, Welsh, and Hungarian.

The album included an eight-page booklet which included the lyrics to all fifteen songs and recording information in English, German, Japanese, French, Italian and Spanish.

The original South African LP release featured all 15 songs on one disc, however did not include the booklet.

== Track listing ==
All songs written and arranged by Joe Jackson. Produced by Joe Jackson and David Kershenbaum.

No.	Title	Length
1.	"Wild West"	4:37
2.	"Right and Wrong"	4:35
3.	"(It's A) Big World"	4:44
4.	"Precious Time"	3:23
5.	"Tonight and Forever"	2:31
6.	"Shanghai Sky"	5:10
7.	"Fifty Dollar Love Affair"	3:38
8.	"We Can't Live Together"	5:25
9.	"Forty Years"	4:26
10.	"Survival"	2:19
11.	"Soul Kiss"	4:44
12.	"The Jet Set"	3:50
13.	"Tango Atlantico"	2:58
14.	"Home Town"	3:12
15.	"Man in the Street"	5:05

This is the track sequence for the compact disc and LP. The cassette release has the same tracks, but in a slightly different order.

== Personnel ==
Musicians

- Joe Jackson - piano, recorder, accordion, melodica, vocals
- Vinnie Zummo - guitars, vocals
- Rick Ford - bass, acoustic guitar, vocals
- Gary Burke - drums
- Joy Askew, Nikki Gregoroff, Peter Hewlett, Curtis King Jr. - extra backing vocals

Production

- Joe Jackson and David Kershenbaum - producer
- Michael Frondelli - recording engineer
- Guy Charbonneau - remote recording technician
- Dave Roberts - onstage technician
- Dave Hewitt - remote recording production coordinator
- Eddie Ciletti - digital tape technician

== Covers ==
- Amy Fox covered "Be My Number Two/Shanghai Sky" and Mary Lee's Corvette covered "Home Town" on the 2004 album Different for Girls: Women Artists and Female-Fronted Bands Cover Joe Jackson.

== Charts ==
=== Weekly charts ===
Weekly chart performance for Big World
Chart (1986)	Peak position
Australian Albums (Kent Music Report)	22
Canada Top Albums/CDs (RPM)	35
Dutch Albums (Album Top 100)	2
European Albums (Music & Media)	23
German Albums (Offizielle Top 100)	24
Italian Albums (Musica e dischi)	13
New Zealand Albums (RMNZ)	27
Swedish Albums (Sverigetopplistan)	38
Swiss Albums (Schweizer Hitparade)	18
UK Albums (Official Charts)	41
US Billboard 200	34

=== Year-end charts ===
Year-end chart performance for Big World
Chart (1986)	Position
Dutch Albums (Album Top 100)	26

== Sales and certifications ==
Certifications for Big World
Region	Certification	Certified units/sales
Netherlands (NVPI)	Gold	50,000^{^}
^{^} Shipments figures based on certification alone.
