= Mad at You =

1980 song by the Joe Jackson Band

Single by Joe Jackson Band

from the album Beat Crazy
- B-side: "Enough Is Not Enough"
- Released: 3 October 1980
- Length: 6:03 (album version); 3:15 (single version)
- Label: A&M
- Songwriter: Joe Jackson
- Producer: Joe Jackson

Joe Jackson Band singles chronology
"The Harder They Come" (1980)	"Mad at You" (1980)	"Beat Crazy" (1981)

"Mad at You" is a song by the Joe Jackson Band, which was released in 1980 as the lead single from Jackson's third studio album Beat Crazy. The song was written and produced by Jackson.

== Background ==
The song's title was inspired by a critic who erroneously said in their review of one of Jackson's New York concerts that the band performed a song with that title. Jackson said at the time, "We've got a review from a New York show which said that we did some great new songs including 'Mad at You' and at the time there was no such song. I'm not knocking that writer though – I thought it was a great title, so I used it."

For its release as a single, the six-minute album version of "Mad at You" was remixed and edited. The B-side, "Enough Is Not Enough", did not appear on Beat Crazy and was exclusive to the single. The single was released on 3 October 1980, preceding the release of Beat Crazy. It was not a commercial success and failed to enter the UK Singles Chart, but did reach number 85 on the Record Business Singles Chart.

== Music video ==
The song's music video was directed by Derek Burbidge. It features Jackson portraying both the husband and wife characters, the latter being achieved by Jackson dressing in drag. The video shows the husband sat at the kitchen table having his breakfast, his plate overflowing with beans, while his wife is in the bedroom taking a long time to fix her makeup. The husband is later seen in the hallway holding a table knife as he impatiently waits for his wife to finish preparing herself to go out. These scenes are interspersed with footage of the band performing the song on a stage.

Jackson told Paul Gambaccini for Channel 4's The Other Side of the Tracks in 1983, "It didn't quite have the macabre effect that it was supposed to have. [The husband] threat[ens] [his wife] with the knife that he's just been eating the baked beans with that she's poured onto his plate. It was supposed to be tomato sauce dripping off the dinner knife and you were supposed to think it was blood, stuff like that... it never quite worked out."

== Critical reception ==
Upon its release as a single, Paul Rambali of the NME wrote, "Jackson toys with dissonance and other modish devices on a song that finds him once again exasperated at the so-called weaker sex." Ronnie Gurr of Record Mirror felt the song was "decidedly undistinguished", commenting, "Furious great bass and guitar sound for sure, but a rolling rant that goes nowhere though the falsetto bit cheers up proceedings no end." Tony Jasper of Music Week noted the song's "jerky, fast-paced rhythm", "girls employed on verse lines" and "solid handclap beat". However, he added, "For all its merits, [the] basic commercial idea [is] not clearly defined, with too many intermingling competing elements." Peter Trollope of the Liverpool Echo noted the "strong, chumpy guitar sound" and "strung out beat", but added the song "should come over a lot better live than it does in the studio".

In a review of Beat Crazy, Clint Roswell of the Daily News felt Jackson "is at his angry and perceptive best with songs like 'Mad at You'". Greg Beebe of the Santa Cruz Sentinel praised Beat Crazy as "easily one of the best records of the year" and picked the "angry, urgent" "Mad at You" as one of his "top choice[s]". Len Righi of The Morning Call stated, "Jackson doesn't supply melodies for most of the material. He and his crackerjack band still play an attractive rock/reggae blend, but often they fall back on Devo/B-52s rhythms that make songs such as 'Mad at You' boring and aimless."

The Chicago Sun-Times commented, "On 'One to One', Jackson sarcastically accuses his beloved of showing more affection for causes than for him. But on 'Mad at You', he willingly glosses over all kinds of interpersonal irritation, letting love come through." The newspaper added that "both songs have melodies that correspond to their thematic complexity". Rick Shefchik of Knight-Ridder Newspapers commented, "...'Mad at You' furthers the man-vs-woman theme brilliantly, as Jackson pouts because his woman has failed to prepare his breakfast properly or get dressed fast enough to suit him. It's all heavily ironic, but Jackson is addressing the dark impulses we all know we shouldn't express."

Ben Horowitz of The Boston Globe stated, "On relatively simple pop, Jackson's band seemed more than adequate, but its weaknesses are often glaring in what it attempts here, particularly on 'Mad at You,' whose 6 minutes are interminable." Jerry DeMarco of The Record felt that Jackson's "mechanically boosted shriek" on the track is "enough to cause a listener to want to smash the record". Vincent Paterno of The News felt the song was "an aimless composition with a Sandy Nelson-like drum backbone" which recalled "Teen Beat".

== Track listing ==
7" single

1. "Mad at You" – 3:15
2. "Enough Is Not Enough" – 3:06

== Personnel ==
Joe Jackson Band

- Joe Jackson – vocals, keyboards
- Gary Sanford – guitar
- Graham Maby – bass, backing vocals
- Dave Houghton – drums, backing vocals

Production

- Joe Jackson – producer, arranger
- Norman Mighell – engineer
- Nigel Mills – assistant engineer

Other

- Anton Corbijn – photography

== Charts ==
Chart (1981)	Peak position
UK Singles Chart (Record Business)	85
