= Right and Wrong (song) =

Single by Joe Jackson

from the album Big World
- Released: 1986
- Length: 4:11
- Label: A&M
- Songwriter(s): Joe Jackson
- Producer(s): David Kershenbaum; Joe Jackson

Joe Jackson singles chronology
"Go for It" (1985)	"Right and Wrong" (1986)	"Left of Center" (1986)

"Right and Wrong" is a song by British singer-songwriter and musician Joe Jackson, which was released in 1986 as the lead single from his live album Big World. It was written by Jackson, and produced by David Kershenbaum and Jackson. "Right and Wrong" peaked at No. 90 on the UK Singles Chart, and No. 11 on the US Billboard Album Rock Tracks chart.

== Background ==
"Right and Wrong" was inspired by a speech made by Ronald Reagan in March 1985 where he defended the United States' involvement in the Nicaraguan Revolution. Jackson told The Boston Globe in 1986: "I heard a Reagan speech about supporting the Contras in Nicaragua. That's where he said it was not a question of right and left, but of right and wrong. But anyone with a modicum of intelligence can see it's absolutely, definitely a question of right versus left." After the song was written, Reagan asked Congress for $100 million to support the Contras in February 1986, which Jackson felt added further meaning to the song: "Reagan has been ranting and raving about terrorism, but now he's given the Contras $100 million so they can commit their own terrorism. This is the kind of thing I get angry about - and when I get angry about something, it's going to come out in my work."

== Critical reception ==
On its release as a single, Paul Benbow of the Reading Evening Post considered the song to be "another blast from the not too distant past with a hard-hitting rock sound". Jerry Smith of Music Week wrote, "Deciding to record his latest album live has paid off as this single shows, adding a crisp, vibrant feel that ought to revive his chart ambitions." John Lee of the Huddersfield Daily Examiner described it as a "moody exercise in hard-edged sophistication" and "typical Jackson" with its "sneering vocals coupled with a gritty and economical music track". He felt the song was not Jackson's "best by any means", but added that it was "certainly a worthy notch in [his] tally of essential listening".

Billboard considered the "in-concert recording" to give the song's "scathing political observation an eyeball-to-eyeball immediacy." Cash Box described it as an "enchanting and sultry single" which "proves social conscience and good rock still go together well". In a retrospective review of Big World, Jason Damas of AllMusic commented: "The best moments, like "Right and Wrong," establish Big World as one of the best and most overlooked records of Joe Jackson's career."

== Track listing ==
7" single

1. "Right and Wrong" - 4:11
2. "Breaking Us in Two" (Live Version) - 4:20

12" single

1. "Right and Wrong" - 4:35
2. "Breaking Us in Two" (Live Version) - 4:20
3. "I'm the Man" (Live Version) - 3:47

12" single (US promo)

1. "Right and Wrong" (Single Version) - 4:11
2. "Right and Wrong" - 4:35

== Personnel ==
Right and Wrong

- Joe Jackson - vocals, piano
- Vinnie Zummo - guitars, backing vocals
- Rick Ford - bass, backing vocals
- Gary Burke - drums
- Joy Askew, Nikki Gregoroff, Peter Hewlett, Curtis King Jr. - backing vocals

Production

- David Kershenbaum, Joe Jackson - producers
- Michael Frondelli - recording engineer

== Charts ==
Chart (1986)	Peak position
Australia Kent Music Report	64
UK Singles Chart	90
US Billboard Album Rock Tracks	11
