= (He's a) Shape in a Drape =

1988 song by Joe Jackson

Single by Joe Jackson

from the album Tucker
- Released: 14 November 1988
- Length: 2:59
- Label: A&M
- Songwriter: Joe Jackson
- Producer: Joe Jackson

Joe Jackson singles chronology
"Is She Really Going Out with Him? (Live)" (1988)	"(He's a) Shape in a Drape" (1988)	"Nineteen Forever" (1989)

"(He's a) Shape in a Drape" is a song by British singer-songwriter and musician Joe Jackson, which was released in 1988 as a single from the soundtrack album of the American biographical comedy-drama film Tucker: The Man and His Dream. The song was written and produced by Jackson.

== Critical reception ==
In a review of the single, Paul Massey of the Aberdeen Evening Express described Jackson as "a talented guy" and noted the song returned Jackson to "his Jumpin' Jive era". Andrew Hirst of the Huddersfield Daily Examiner considered it to be "jolly gentle jazz swing fun from one of music's top songsmiths".

In a review of the Tucker soundtrack, Tom Moon of The Philadelphia Inquirer considered "(He's a) Shape in a Drape" to be "the most engaging" of the three tracks to feature vocals. Tomm Carroll, writing for the News-Pilot commented: "With a nod to the commercial, Tucker [features] a couple of vocal pieces compatible with the style of the score, [including] the swing-fest, "(He's a) Shape in a Drape"." Carroll added that the song "smacks of a hit single".

== Track listing ==
7" and cassette single

1. "(He's a) Shape in a Drape" - 2:59
2. "Speedway" - 2:40

7" single (US promo)

1. "(He's a) Shape in a Drape" - 2:59
2. "(He's a) Shape in a Drape" - 2:59

CD single

1. "(He's a) Shape in a Drape" - 2:59
2. "Soul Kiss" (Live) - 4:51
3. "Monday Papers" (Live) - 4:58

CD single (US promo)

1. "(He's a) Shape in a Drape" - 2:59

== Personnel ==
Production

- Joe Jackson - producer, arranger
- David Anderle - album coordinator
- Seigen Ono - recording and mixing on "Soul Kiss" and "Monday Papers"
- David Kershenbaum - mixing engineer on "Soul Kiss" and "Monday Papers"
- Kevin Smith - remix engineer on "Soul Kiss" and "Monday Papers"

== Charts ==
=== Weekly charts ===
Chart (1988)	Peak position
Australia Kent Music Report	87
Belgium (Ultratop 50 Flanders)	30
Canada Top Singles (RPM)	73
Italy Airplay (Music & Media)	7
Netherlands (Dutch Top 40)	29
Netherlands (Single Top 100)	35
