= Mike's Murder (soundtrack) =

- 1983 cover

Soundtrack album by Joe Jackson
- Released: September 1983
- Recorded: 1983
- Studio: A & R (New York City)
- Length: 38:50
- Label: A&M
- Producer: Joe Jackson

Joe Jackson chronology
| Night and Day (1982) | Mike's Murder (1983) | Body and Soul (1984) |

Professional ratings
Review scores
| Source | Rating |
|---|---|
| AllMusic | 4/5 stars |

Mike's Murder is the 1983 motion picture soundtrack album from the film Mike's Murder starring Debra Winger and written and directed by James Bridges. The album features original music by Joe Jackson.

== Description ==
When Jackson was asked to compose a song for the film, he composed several pieces that were released as an album in September 1983. The film was eventually scored by John Barry, with little of Jackson's music retained. The album reached the Top 100 in the United States, and the songs "Memphis" and "Cosmopolitan" were released as singles. "Breakdown", another song from the album, was nominated for a Grammy in the Best Pop Instrumental Performance category.

The Mike's Murder soundtrack was first released on CD, in its entirety, as part of the three-disc The Ultimate Collection in 2003, and separately released on CD in 2006 on the Lilith label. The album's first five tracks were also included on the 2003 deluxe edition reissue of Jackson's Night and Day album.

In June 2009, Prometheus Records released a CD of John Barry's replacement soundtrack, containing the entire score.

== Track listing ==
Written, arranged and produced by Joe Jackson.

| No. | Title | Length |
|---|---|---|
| 1. | "Cosmopolitan" | 4:36 |
| 2. | "1-2-3 Go! (This Town's a Fairground)" | 3:00 |
| 3. | "Laundromat Monday" | 3:31 |
| 4. | "Memphis" | 4:44 |
| 5. | "Moonlight" | 4:21 |
| 6. | "Zémio" (instrumental) | 11:05 |
| 7. | "Breakdown" (instrumental) | 3:59 |
| 8. | "Moonlight Theme" (instrumental) | 3:25 |
| Total length: | | 38:50 |

== Charts ==
=== Weekly charts ===
| Chart (1983) | Peak position |
|---|---|
| Australia Albums (Kent Music Report) | 91 |
| Dutch Albums (Album Top 100) | 10 |
| New Zealand Albums (RMNZ) | 28 |
| US Billboard 200 | 64 |

=== Year-end charts ===
| Chart (1983) | Position |
|---|---|
| Dutch Albums (Album Top 100) | 97 |

== Personnel ==
Musicians

- Joe Jackson – vocals, keyboards, vibraphone, xylophone, percussion, alto saxophone
- Joy Askew – Prophet-5 synthesizer programming
- Graham Maby – bass
- Larry Tolfree – drums
- Sue Hadjopoulos – congas, bongos, percussion

Production

- Jeff Gold – executive producer
- Becky Shargo – executive producer
- Joe Jackson – producer, arrangements
- David Kershenbaum – producer (4)
- Bradshaw Leigh – engineer
- Larry Franke – assistant engineer
- Phil Jamtaas – remixing
- David Bianco – remix assistant
- John LaSalandra – film music editing
- Chuck Beeson – art direction
- Melanie Nissen – design
- Peter Sorel – front cover photography
- Greg Gorman – photography of Joe Jackson
