= Richard Ford (music editor) =

British music editor and producer

- Born: London, England
- Occupations: Film music editor, record producer
- Instrument: Bass
- Years active: 1995–present

Richard Ford, formerly known as Rick Ford, is a music editor and record producer for feature film soundtracks and scores. He has worked with a number of critically acclaimed film makers, including Ben Affleck, Alexander Payne, Ted Demme and Kathryn Bigelow. He started his musical career as a bass player in his home town of London and later in New York City, working with, amongst others, guitarist Bill Nelson and singer/songwriter Joe Jackson. Ford moved to Los Angeles in the 1990s, where he started his music editing career. He is best known for his work on films such as Argo, The Descendants, Sideways, Election, Training Day and American History X.

== Early career ==
Ford grew up in London within a musical family. He started playing piano at the age of four, and became a member of Andrew Lloyd Webber and Tim Rice’s boys choir at the age of ten. He went on to study cello and alto sax as a teenager, and by his 20s had become known as a session bass player in London and later in New York. During this time he recorded and toured with various artists including guitarist Bill Nelson (on his project Bill Nelson's Red Noise), singer/songwriter Bram Tchaikovsky, singer Mary Hopkin, producer Tony Visconti and singer/songwriter Joe Jackson on his Big World album and world tours.

Ford moved to Los Angeles and began his music editing career in the 1990s, starting up on the Xena Warrior Princess syndicated television show. He then moved on to work on such feature films as Love Jones (1997) and Polish Wedding (1998) with Italian composer and Academy Award-winner Luis Bakalov. In 1998 he went to work on the iconic film American History X (1998) with the Academy Award-winning composer, Anne Dudley.

In the following years he worked on such films as Training Day (2001), Ted Demme's Blow (2001) and the surfing movie Blue Crush (2002).

== Collaborators ==
Ford's most notable collaboration is his long-time relationship with filmmaker Alexander Payne. Ford has been part of Payne's creative team since the film Election (1999), and has continued to work with him on the films About Schmidt (2002) and Sideways (2004). When Payne made The Descendants in 2011, Ford was credited as Executive Music Producer and played a major role in the creative development of the soundtrack. On Nebraska (2013), Ford continued his expanded role as music producer, music editor and producer of the film's soundtrack CD.

In 2012, Ford joined Ben Affleck's team on Academy Award-winner Argo, and Kathryn Bigelow on Zero Dark Thirty.

Some of Ford's other notable collaborations include his work with composers Alexandre Desplat, Mycheal Danna, Christophe Beck, Mark Isham, Rolfe Kent and Mark Orton.

Ford has also been involved with Alexander Payne's The Holdovers (2023) as executive music producer, music editor and co-producer of the score soundtrack – with Mark Orton composing the score.

Ford started to focus on his own music in 2018. He released Basso Profondissimo EP (2018) – a solo project conceived and played on electric bass. The Basso Profondissimo 2 album followed in 2021.

== Filmography ==
- The Holdovers (2023)
- Downsizing (2017)
- Hidden Figures (2016)
- Money Monster (2015)
- Parched (2015)
- The Imitation Game (2014)
- St. Vincent (2014)
- Nebraska (executive music producer, soundtrack producer, music editor – 2013)
- The Incredible Burt Wonderstone (2013)
- Zero Dark Thirty (2012)
- Argo (2012)
- The Lucky One (2012)
- The Muppets (scoring music editor – 2011)
- The Descendants (executive music producer, music editor – 2011)
- Red (2010)
- The Time Traveler's Wife (2009)
- Semi-Pro (2008)
- The Nativity Story (2006)
- Sideways (2004)
- The Life and Death of Peter Sellers (2004)
- Friday After Next (2002)
- Blue Crush (2002)
- About Schmidt (2002)
- Training Day (2001)
- Blow (2001)
- The Cell (2000)
- Election (1999)
- American History X (1998)
- The Theory of Flight (1998)
- Polish Wedding (1998)
- Cinderella (TV movie – 1997)
- Love Jones (1997)
- Death in Granada (1996)

== Awards and nominations ==
=== Awards ===
- 2012 – Golden Reel Award – Best Sound Editing – Music in a Musical Feature Film for The Muppets (2011). Shared With: Lisa Jaime (supervising music editor)
- 1999 – Primetime Emmy – Outstanding Sound Editing for a Miniseries, Movie or a Special – The Life and Death of Peter Sellers (HBO, 2004).

=== Nominations ===
- 2013 – Golden Reel Award – Argo – Best Sound Editing – Music in a Feature Film
- 1999 – Golden Reel Award – Best Sound Editing – Music (Foreign & Domestic) for American History X (1998).
- 1998 – Golden Reel Award – Best Sound Editing – Television Movies of the Week – Music for Cinderella (1997).
