= Heaven & Hell (Joe Jackson album) =

Studio album by Joe Jackson
- Released: 2 September 1997
- Genres: Rock, pop, classical music
- Length: 50:25
- Label: Sony Classical
- Producers: Joe Jackson and Ed Roynesdal

Joe Jackson chronology
This Is It! (The A&M Years 1979-1989) (1997)	Heaven & Hell (1997)	Symphony No. 1 (1999)

Heaven & Hell is the 13th studio album by Joe Jackson, a musical interpretation and song cycle representing the seven deadly sins. It was released in the US on 2 September 1997 and in the UK on 29 September 1997.

Billed to Joe Jackson & Friends; the friends included vocalists Dawn Upshaw ("Angel (Lust)"), Joy Askew ("Tuzla (Avarice)"), Suzanne Vega ("Angel (Lust)"), Brad Roberts from the Crash Test Dummies ("Passacaglia/A Bud and a Slice (Sloth)"), Jane Siberry ("The Bridge (Envy)"); and violinist Nadja Salerno-Sonnenberg ("Prelude", "Fugue 2/Song of Daedalus (Pride)").

This album was subsequently performed on tour with Jackson on piano, accordion and melodica, Valerie Vigoda on violin and vocals, and Elise Morris on keyboards, glockenspiel and vocals. The drums were programmed with the exception of "Right (Anger)" - which had drummers Dan Hickey and Kenny Aronoff drumming on opposite speakers through most of the song, and Jared Crawford of the musical Stomp playing plastic buckets in Times Square during the bridge.

"Angel (Lust)" and "Passacaglia - A Bud And A Slice (Sloth)" were issued from the album as promotional singles in the US and Europe. Both were released to target adult album alternative radio.

== Background ==
After the release of his 1991 album Laughter & Lust, Jackson suffered from writer's block for two years. Although his record company, Virgin Records, were expecting him to continue writing contemporary pop material, Jackson decided he had to "go forward and do something fresh" musically, resulting in 1994's Night Music. Virgin released the album but were not fully supportive of the artist's new direction. In the early stages of the Heaven & Hell project, Jackson presented the label with some demo recordings. The label expressed interest in using the option in their contract with him to pick up a third album, but Jackson noted that "not everyone was enthusiastic" about the demos. He told Billboard in 1997, "I think they were waiting for me to make Look Sharp! again or something. They had no real understanding or enthusiasm on the whole for the direction I was going in." Jackson's request to be let go from a third album was granted and he began working on Heaven & Hell without being signed to a label. He originally planned to find a small label or release the album independently, but was surprised to gain the interest of several classical labels and subsequently signed with Sony Classical.

Wanting to record a concept album, Jackson chose to cover the seven deadly sins as it was a "particularly timeless and well-known" theme to interpret. He said in 1997, "My [belief] of the seven deadly sins is that they can all lead to either heaven or hell. We all have all seven in us and we all have heaven and hell inside us as well." To write the album, Jackson spent two years researching and reading literature on sin, a process he found "interesting" and made him "question a lot of things about what I believed". Jackson then began recording the album in November 1996. He started by using the MIDI sequencing software Opcode Vision for the keyboard parts and samples, then added live piano, strings, percussion and vocals. With the exception of having Suzanne Vega in mind when writing "Angel (Lust)", the musicians guesting on the album were "unplanned and grew out of the music", with Jackson comparing himself to a "casting director finding the right voices to play the characters". After its release, Jackson called Heaven & Hell "the best thing I've done". He also said, "I found a lot of humour in this theme. A lot of the record is satirical and funny, at least to me anyway."

In a 1997 interview with Billboard, Jackson summaried, "I like[d] the idea of making a record with an overall theme, so I looked for [one] to give structure to the work. The album's framework goes through the seven deadly sins in the traditional order of getting progressively worse, and I was very intrigued by the way that suggested a musical structure to me. So it gave me a sort of framework to hang the musical ideas on, but it's also a very intriguing subject with timeless appeal."

== Song information ==
- "Fugue 1/More Is More" (gluttony): Jackson provided the track with a fugue that becomes "excruciatingly full of notes to represent excess". He described the song's narrator as "completely crass and just interested in shoving as much food and drink as he can down his throat". Jackson drew some inspiration for the lyrics from the third circle of hell in Inferno, the first part of Italian writer Dante Alighieri's 14th-century narrative poem The Divine Comedy.
- "Angel" (lust) utilises two female voices to represent a "virgin and whore contradiction". Dawn Upshaw provides the vocals of the "celestial virgin" and Suzanne Vega represents a hooker who uses "ridiculous" pick-up lines. Jackson summarised the concept, "They're the archetypal Madonna and whore and the idea is that they're sort of fighting over the soul of some poor, confused, horny young guy, [who is] being tempted in two directions at once."
- "Tuzla" (avarice): Jackson said that, while much of the album has humour in it, "Tuzla" does not "except in the blackest possible sense". He aimed to create a "heaviness and feeling of foreboding" on the track and drew inspiration from the concept of war where "smuggling, black marketeering and profiteering" occurs. Joy Askew sings the part of a conscience, with Jackson describing her role as "kind of the moral core of the whole thing, like a war widow or someone like this". Jackson provides the voice of both "greed" and "cynicism", with the latter based on a "cynical observer who's supposed to be like a UN soldier or maybe a journalist" talking through a radio. The other voices on the track resemble "regular people trapped in the situation" who are "reduced to whatever they have to sell or trade".
- "Passacaglia/A Bud and a Slice" (sloth): Jackson wanted to feature a "deep, world-weary and lugubrious" voice on the track and picked Brad Roberts for the role.
- "Right" (anger): For what he saw as the "childish" aspect of anger, Jackson inserted out of tune piano parts with "someone just bashing the keyboard with their fists like kids do". He also had the idea of using two drummers "thrashing away like maniacs". While recording the album, Jackson came across a bucket drummer, Jared Crawford, playing in Times Square and recorded him live in the street for inclusion on the track. He used a portable DAT recorder to capture Crawford, who played to an electronic metronome.
- "The Bridge" (envy): Jackson chose to portray envy between two sisters and was influenced by the story of Cinderella. Jane Siberry provides vocals on the track from the point of view of the envied.

== Critical reception ==
Professional ratings
Review scores
Source	Rating
The Age	3/5 stars
AllMusic	2/5 stars
The Atlanta Journal-Constitution	C
The Republican	2.5/5 stars
San Francisco Chronicle	4/5 stars
Uncut	2/5 stars
USA Today	3/4 stars
Winston-Salem Journal	3/4 stars
York Evening Press	4/5 stars

Upon its release, Julian Cole of the York Evening Press noted how, although the music is "difficult for a pop audience" and "perhaps pretentious for a classical audience", there is a "great energy and inventiveness about Jackson's compositions, mixing beautiful operatic vocals with cool adult pop". Dan Ouellette of the San Francisco Chronicle believed Jackson had "struck gold" by "creat[ing] an unlikely marriage of classical pop", with "poignancy, humor and beauty" and "superb talents from both spheres to help him realize his compelling song cycle". Ed Bumgardner of the Winston-Salem Journal felt that Jackson had successfully "integrate[d] elements of rock and jazz within orchestral arrangements [to] keep the bold undertaking accessible", resulting in songs that "are as appealing as they are theatrical". Chuck Graham, writing for the Tucson Citizen, described it a "very serious work", with "eerie", "melancholy" and "strong theatrical" feelings, and "shifting rhythms and textures giving each sin its own distinct mental image".

David Patrick Stearns of USA Today summarised that Jackson had "lost none of his bite and originality", although he added that "not all the sins [produce] equally interesting" results. Kevin O'Hare of The Republican praised the "stunning" "Angel (Lust)" for being "worth the price of the album alone", but felt the rest of the material was a "mixed bag", producing an album "more noteworthy for its ambitious nature than the actual execution of the concept". Eileen M. Drennen of The Atlanta Journal-Constitution said that the album is "packed full of highbrow guests, classical and pop", but felt the theme "exceeds [the] reach [of] Jackson's grasp".

== Dramatic adaptation ==
In Boston in 2007, the album was adapted into a jukebox musical under the name Heaven & Hell: The Fantastical Temptation of the 7 Deadly Sins, with the script written by Jason Slavick. The play followed the album's track listing, with each vice presented through a mixture of dance and a representation of each sin in daily life. Heaven & Hell had a five-day run at the Boston Conservatory.

== Track listing ==
All songs written and arranged by Joe Jackson.

No.	Title	Length
1.	"Prelude"	2:59
2.	"Fugue 1/More Is More" (Gluttony)	5:32
3.	"Angel" (Lust)	7:11
4.	"Tuzla" (Avarice)	7:33
5.	"Passacaglia/A Bud and a Slice" (Sloth)	8:36
6.	"Right" (Anger)	4:40
7.	"The Bridge" (Envy)	5:59
8.	"Fugue 2/Song of Daedalus" (Pride)	7:55

== Personnel ==
Musicians

- Joe Jackson – piano, bongos on "Prelude", vocals on "Fugue 1/More is More", "Passacaglia/A Bud and a Slice" and "Fugue 2/Song of Daedalus", voice of Soul in Torment on "Angel", voices of Cynicism and Greed on "Tuzla"
- Nadja Salerno-Sonnenberg – solo violin on "Prelude" and on "Fugue 2/Song of Daedalus"
- Dawn Upshaw – voice of Angel on "Angel", voice of Forgetfulness on "Tuzla"
- Suzanne Vega – voice of Fallen Angel on "Angel"
- Mary Rowell – violin on "Angel"
- Allison Cornell – viola on "Angel"
- Sue Hadjopoulos – congas and bongos on "Angel" and on "The Bridge"
- Joy Askew – voice of Conscience on "Tuzla"
- Brad Roberts – vocals on "Passacaglia/A Bud and a Slice"
- Judith LeClair – bassoon on "Passacaglia/A Bud and a Slice"
- Dan Hickey – drums (left) on "Right"
- Kenny Aronoff – drums (right) on "Right"
- Jared Crawford – plastic buckets on Times Square
- Jane Siberry – vocals on "The Bridge"
- Mary Rowell, Laura Seaton, Sandra Park, Joyce Hammann, Todd Reynolds, Mark Feldman, Naomi Katz, Cenovia Cummins, James Tsao – violins
- Juliet Haffner, Allison Cornell, David Blinn, Katherine Beeson, Mary Rowell – violas
- Erik Friedlander, Stephanie Cummins, Richard Locker – cellos
- William Sloat – acoustic bass

Production

- Joe Jackson – arrangements, producer, art direction, photography
- Ed Roynesdal – co-producer
- Dan Gellert – recording engineer
- Rich Alvy – assistant recording engineer
- Ted Jensen – mastering engineer
- Mary Rowell – string section coordination
- P.R. Brown – art direction
- Jana Leön – photography

== Charts ==
Chart performance for Heaven & Hell
Chart (1997)	Peak position
US Top Classical Albums (Billboard)	3
US Top Classical Crossover Albums (Billboard)	3
