= You Can't Get What You Want (Till You Know What You Want) =

Single by Joe Jackson

from the album Body and Soul
- B-side: "Cha Cha Loco"
- Released: 1984
- Recorded: 1984
- Studio: Masonic Hall (Manhattan)
- Genre: Sophisti-pop, jazz, funk
- Length: 3:42 (Single Version); 4:54 (Album Version)
- Label: A&M Records
- Songwriter: Joe Jackson
- Producers: David Kershenbaum and Joe Jackson

Joe Jackson singles chronology
"Memphis" (1983)	"You Can't Get What You Want (Till You Know What You Want)" (1984)	"Happy Ending" (1984)

"You Can't Get What You Want (Till You Know What You Want)" is a single from Joe Jackson's 1984 album Body and Soul. It spent sixteen weeks on the US Billboard Hot 100 and was Jackson's second-highest charted song in America when it peaked at number 15 the week of June 23, 1984.

In addition to the 7” single, it was also released as a 12” single, remixed by John "Jellybean" Benitez.

== Background ==
The track features a slap bass performance from Jackson's longtime bassist Graham Maby. Maby recalled, "For 'You Can't Get What You Want,' on Body and Soul, Joe wanted me to slap. It was certainly not one of my strengths, but I think the track came out fine, and it was fun to play live."

== Reception ==
Glide Magazine ranked the song as Jackson's third best song. Mike DeGagne of AllMusic called the song "explosive."

== Charts ==
Chart (1984)	Peak position
Australia (Kent Music Report)	96
Canada Singles Chart	30
UK Singles Chart	77
US Billboard Hot 100	15
US Adult Contemporary (Billboard)	13
