= Jumpin' Jive =

1939 song by Cab Calloway, Frank Froeba, Jack Palmer

"Jumping Jive" (also known as "(Hep-Hep!) The Jumpin' Jive") is a famous jazz/swing composition, written by Cab Calloway, Frank Froeba, and Jack Palmer. Originally recorded on 17 July 1939, on Vocalion Records, it sold over a million copies and reached #2 on the Pop chart. Calloway performs the song with his orchestra and the Nicholas Brothers in the 1943 musical film Stormy Weather.

== Joe Jackson version ==
"Jumpin' Jive"

Single by Joe Jackson's Jumpin' Jive

from the album Joe Jackson's Jumpin' Jive
- B-side: "Knock Me a Kiss"
- Released: June 1981
- Studio: Basing Street Studios (London, England)
- Genre: Jump blues, swing revival
- Length: 2:41
- Label: A&M
- Songwriter(s): Cab Calloway, Frank Froeba, Jack Palmer
- Producer(s): Joe Jackson

Joe Jackson's Jumpin' Jive singles chronology
"One to One" (1981)	"Jumpin' Jive" (1981)	"Real Men" (1982)

"Jumpin' Jive" was covered by new wave artist Joe Jackson (under the band name Joe Jackson's Jumpin' Jive) on his 1981 album of the same name. The album, originally conceived as "a few pub gigs for a laugh," also featured other jump-blues tracks, including Calloway's "We the Cats (Shall Hep Ya)."

After its release on Jumpin' Jive, Jackson's version was later released as a single, where it charted at #43 in Britain.

=== Charts ===
Chart (1981)	Peak position
Australia (Kent Music Report)	61
New Zealand Singles Chart	32
UK Singles Chart	43

== Other covers ==
It has been recorded notably by Benny Goodman, The Andrews Sisters, Glenn Miller, and Big Bad Voodoo Daddy.
