= Masonic Hall (Manhattan) =

Headquarters of the Grand Lodge of Free and Accepted Masons of the State of New York

Coordinates: 40.74287°N 73.99222°W

Masonic Hall in New York City is the headquarters of the Grand Lodge of Free and Accepted Masons of the State of New York. It has been located at 23rd Street and 6th Avenue in the Flatiron district since 1875. The current building, completed in two phases, dates from 1909 and 1913.

The first Masonic Hall was a Gothic style building located in lower Manhattan, constructed in 1826. The second Masonic Hall was built in 1875 and designed by Napoleon LeBrun and constructed in the Second French Empire Style. The current building was constructed in 1911 to replace the previous Masonic Hall located on the same site.

== History ==
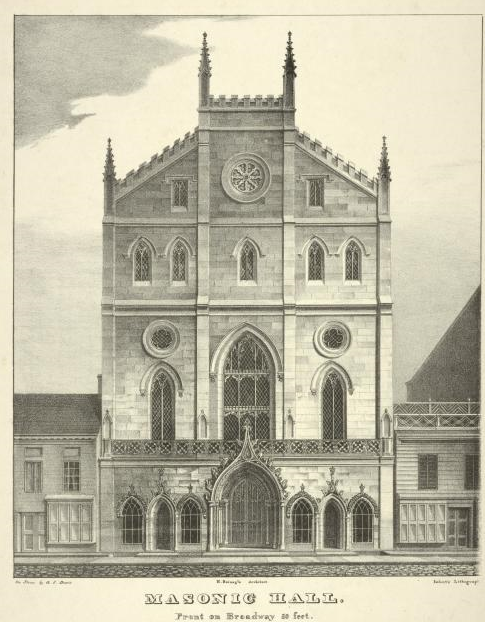
First Masonic Hall (1826-1856) located on Broadway between Reade and Pearl Streets, today the location of the Jacob K. Javits Federal Building.

=== First Masonic Hall (1826–1856) ===
Early masonic meetings and meetings of the Grand Lodge of New York were likely held at taverns as well as an early iteration of Tammany Hall. On June 24, 1826, St. John's Day, the cornerstone was laid for a Gothic style Masonic Hall on Broadway in lower Manhattan between Reade and Pearl Streets, directly across from the original site of the New York Hospital, and today the location of the Jacob K. Javits Federal Building. The original cost of the building was $50,000 or approximately $1.5 million today. The main hall was designed to imitate the chapel of Henry VII at Westminister Abbey. In addition, the building would hold, what was at the time, the largest bowling alley in the world. This would serve as the home of the Grand Lodge until the building was demolished in 1856.

=== Temporary quarters (1856–1875) ===
After the demolition of the first Masonic Hall, Masonic lodges in Manhattan met in other smaller Masonic lodge halls throughout Manhattan and in various rented spaces. The grand lodge sessions of 1870, for example, met at Apollo Hall on Clinton Street, while St. John's Lodge met at Odd Fellows Hall on Grand Street in SoHo.

One of these smaller Masonic lodge halls, at 115 East 13th Street, would be the site of the first meeting of the Shriners on September 26, 1872. In addition to the Masons, the Order of the True Fenians met at this location.

=== Second Masonic Hall (1875–1911) ===
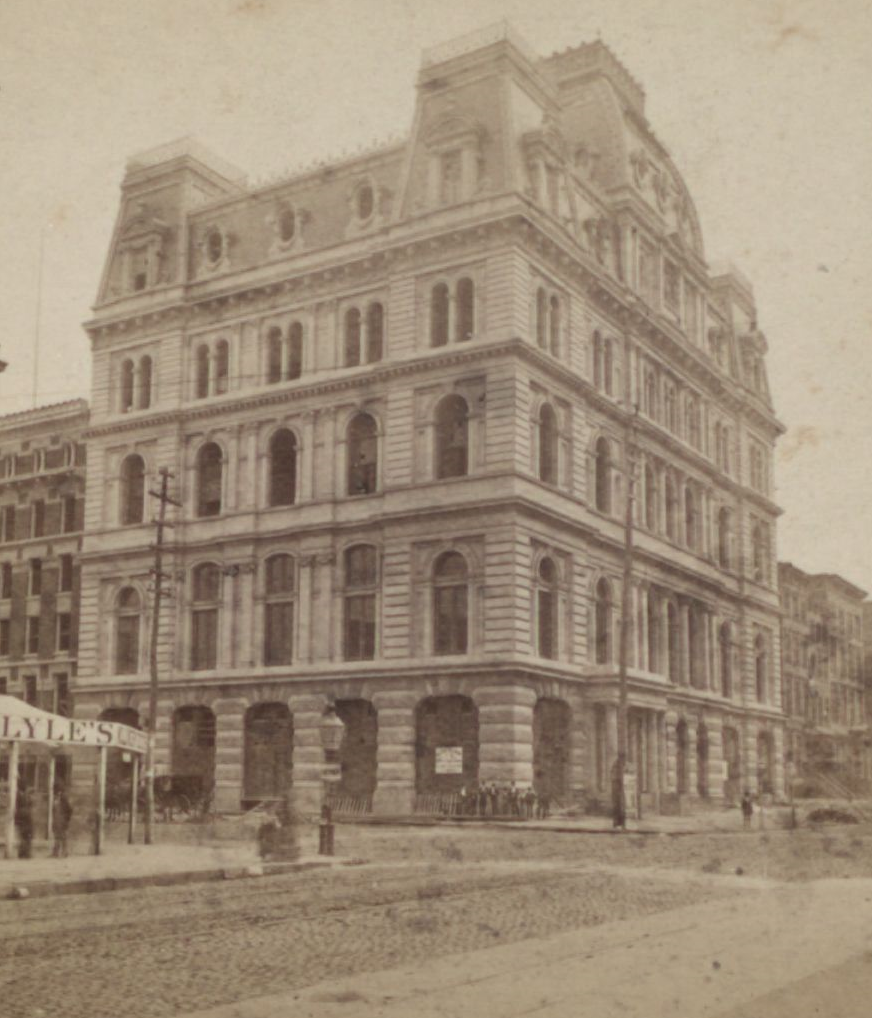
Second Masonic Hall (1875-1911) Photo taken from 23rd Street

Due to infighting in the Grand Lodge, the Panic of 1857, and the American Civil War, it would not be until the mid-1870s that the Grand Lodge would again have a permanent meeting location. On June 8, 1870, the cornerstone was laid for a new Second French Empire Style building at 23rd Street and 6th Avenue which served as the headquarters of the Grand Lodge from 1875 to 1909. It was located directly across the street from Booth's Theatre. The building was designed by Napoleon LeBrun and due to the Panic of 1873 would take four years to complete, at the staggering cost of $1.279 million. Construction was completed in late 1874, with the formal dedication on June 2, 1875.

Although intended to generate financial profit for the Grand Lodge, the building "did not meet financial expectations." In fact, by 1905, some 30 years later, the building had only returned approximately 2 percent of the initial investment. In addition, by the turn of the 20th Century, the Second Empire style was already considered outdated and coupled with rising New York City real estate prices, the building was replaced with the current and more modern skyscraper.

=== Third Masonic Hall (1909–present) ===
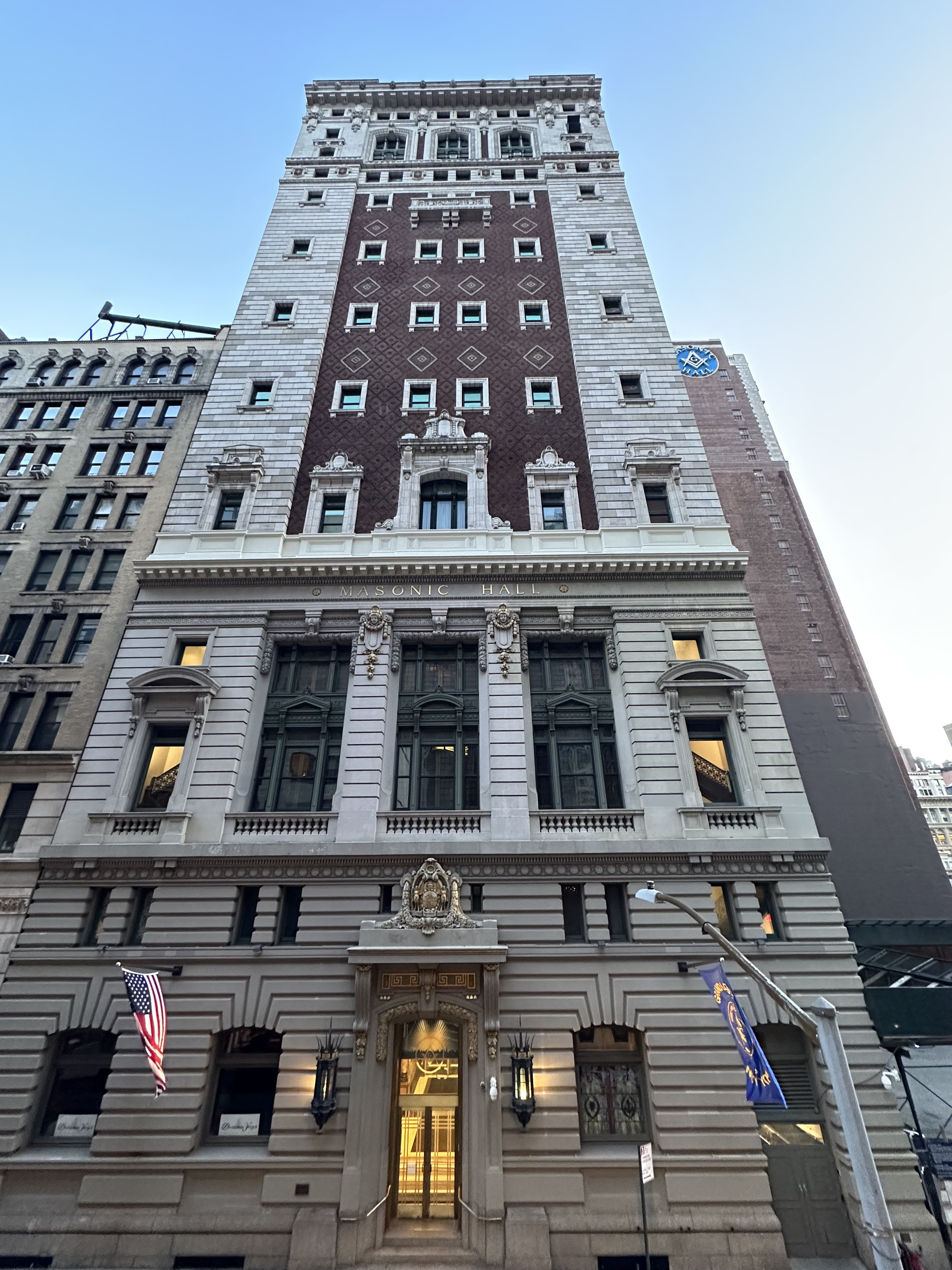
Masonic Hall from 24th Street

The current Grand Lodge building opened in 1909, on the same block, but slightly north of the 1875 building. St. John's Lodge held the first meeting in the new building on September 8, 1909, using the George Washington Bible and presenting a Master Mason degree that evening.

At the time, the building caused some controversy, and Past Grand Master James Ten Eyck resigned as a trustee of the Masonic Hall and Asylum Fund in an effort to convince the then sitting Grand Master Townsend Scudder that the construction of the new building would be unwise.

This building was designed by Harry P. Knowles, one of the architects of the New York City Center. It actually consists of two interconnected buildings, one whose construction began in 1907 facing 24th Street, and the other, completed in 1913, on the corner of 23rd Street and 6th Avenue.

The construction proceeded in two phases. First the 24th Street building was built. When it opened in 1909, the older 1875 Masonic Hall was demolished and replaced by the current office building on 23rd Street that opened in 1913. The 23rd Street building is the larger of the two and is primarily a commercial office building, with rents generating funds for the Grand Lodge's charitable activities and the upkeep of the 24th Street building. The 24th Street building is approximately one-half as large, and consists primarily of lodge meeting rooms, including the 1200-seat Grand Lodge Room, all elaborately ornamented. The lodge rooms are decorated and named after a variety of architectural styles including Corinthian, Doric, Egyptian, Gothic, Ionic, Jacobean, and Renaissance.

The Hall's interior was restored and underwent a $15 million renovation from 1986 to 1996 by Felix Chavez and his company Fine Art Decorating.

The Livingston Library is housed on the 14th floor of the building and is one of relatively few large libraries of Freemasonry books and materials. It is named after Chancellor Robert R. Livingston (1746-1813), one of the earliest Grand Masters of the Grand Lodge of New York.

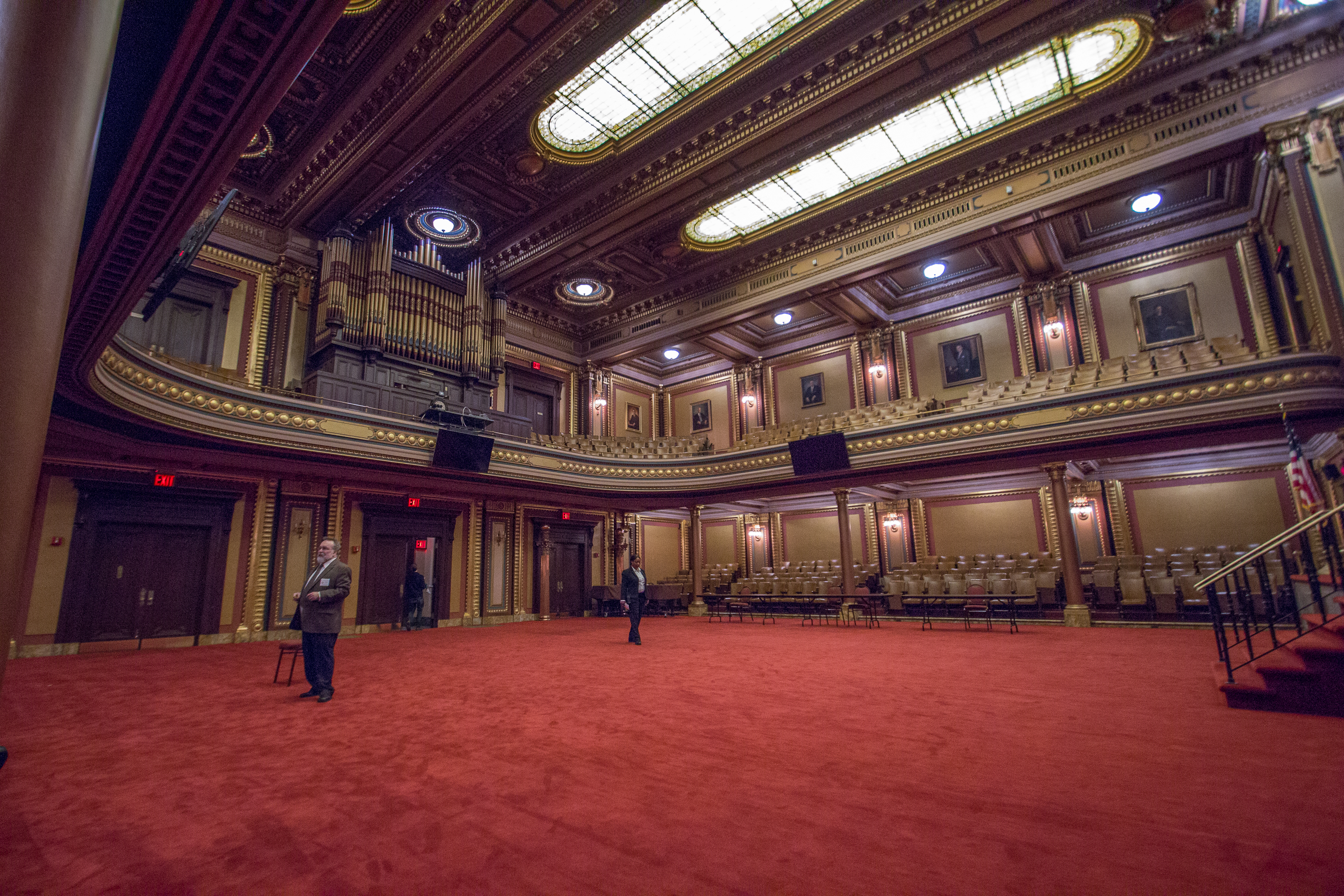
The Grand Lodge Room in the Masonic Hall

== In popular culture ==
Due to its acoustical properties, tracking for Joe Jackson's 1984 album Body and Soul was completed in the building's Grand Lodge Room.

In 2017, comedian Jerrod Carmichael's second stand-up comedy special, 8, directed by Bo Burnham, was also filmed in the Grand Lodge Room.

== Other Masonic buildings in Manhattan ==
Today, Masonic Hall, where all Grand Lodge of New York lodges in Manhattan meet, and the Prince Hall Masonic Temple located at 155th Street, are the only buildings in Manhattan used for Masonic purposes. However, this was not always the case and is likely a consequence of the high property taxes in New York City.

One former Masonic lodge building at 15th Street, home to a number of German-speaking Masonic lodges, is now in use by Friend's Seminary. New York City Center, was built for the Mecca Shriners, and served as their home from 1924 to 1940, when it was sold.

There was also a Scottish Rite Temple on the site of today's James New York - Nomad from 1887 to 1901. The Hammerstein Ballroom also served as a temple for the Scottish Rite during the 1930s.
