= Beat Crazy =

Studio album by The Joe Jackson Band
- Released: 10 October 1980
- Recorded: 1980
- Studios: Basing Street, London
- Genres: New wave, punk rock, ska
- Length: 45:40
- Label: A&M
- Producer: Joe Jackson

The Joe Jackson Band chronology
I'm the Man (1979)	Beat Crazy (1980)	Joe Jackson's Jumpin' Jive (1981)

Singles from Beat Crazy
- 1. "Mad at You" Released: 1980; 2. "Pretty Boys" Released: 1980; 3. "One to One" Released: 1980; 4. "Beat Crazy" Released: 1981

Professional ratings
Review scores
Source	Rating
AllMusic	4/5 stars
Robert Christgau	B

Beat Crazy is the third album by Joe Jackson, released in October 1980 and credited to the Joe Jackson Band. It was a relative disappointment commercially, peaking outside the Top 40 in both the UK and the United States, with its singles failing to chart. One reason for the reduced sales in the U.S. may have been that the group did not tour to support it there. Nevertheless, the Joe Jackson Band was successful and toured extensively. This would be the last studio album released by the Joe Jackson Band's original line-up until 2003's Volume 4.

== Background ==
Beat Crazy was intended to be a stylistic departure from Jackson's first two albums. However, as he recalled, the band lacked a clear direction during the recording. Jackson later stated that he felt the record "didn't really work". He explained,

The stereotypical difficult third album, in which we tried to change the formula a bit without quite knowing how. It's darker than the first two and the reggae influence is more pronounced. There's some good stuff on it (I especially like the title track and 'Biology') but it’s not quite the triumphant swan song of this band.

Musically, the album saw the band take in reggae and ska influences as seen on songs such as "In Every Dream Home", "Mad at You", and "Pretty Boys".

== Critical reception ==
Upon its release, Andy Gill of the NME was negative in his review, calling Beat Crazy a "pretty lame apology for an album, and absolutely nowhere as regards thinking dance music". He concluded, "It masquerades as a series of meaningful meta-musical musings on rock 'n' roll and youth culture in general, which comes down to little more than a couple of hip references/dedications, and the sort of vague, purposeless social-realist songwriting we've come to expect from Jackson."

== Track listing ==
All songs written, arranged and produced by Joe Jackson.

No.	Title	Length
1.	"Beat Crazy" (lead vocal by Graham Maby)	4:15
2.	"One to One"	3:22
3.	"In Every Dream Home (A Nightmare)"	4:31
4.	"The Evil Eye"	3:45
5.	"Mad at You"	6:03
6.	"Crime Don't Pay"	4:24
7.	"Someone Up There"	3:47
8.	"Battleground"	2:33
9.	"Biology"	4:31
10.	"Pretty Boys"	3:41
11.	"Fit"	4:45

== Personnel ==
Musicians

- Joe Jackson – vocals, keyboards, melodica
- Graham Maby – bass, vocals, lead vocal on "Beat Crazy"
- Gary Sanford – guitars
- David Houghton – drums, vocals

Production

- Joe Jackson - arrangements, producer
- Norman Mighell - recording engineer
- Nigel Mills - assistant recording engineer
- Willy Smax - artwork
- Anton Corbijn - photography

== Charts ==
Chart (1980)	Peak position
Australia (Kent Music Report)	82
Dutch Albums (Album Top 100)	32
New Zealand Albums (RMNZ)	47
UK Albums (Official Charts)	42
US Billboard 200	41
