= Beat Crazy (song) =

Single by The Joe Jackson Band

from the album Beat Crazy
- B-side: "Is She Really Going Out With Him?" (live)
- Released: January 1981
- Recorded: 1980
- Genre: New wave, ska
- Length: 4:15
- Label: A&M - AMS 8100
- Songwriter: Joe Jackson
- Producer: Joe Jackson

The Joe Jackson Band singles chronology
"Mad at You" (1980)	"Beat Crazy" (1981)	"One to One" (1981)

"Beat Crazy" is the title track to the Joe Jackson Band's 1981 album Beat Crazy. Written by Joe Jackson, and sung by Graham Maby, it was released as a single in 1981.

== Background ==
According to Jackson, when he performed the song live at Pinkpop Festival in 1980, the song is dedicated to "drug-crazed teenagers all over the world." The lyrics of the song complain of how kids of the time are too busy on drugs – saying that they are all too "beat crazy" – to take responsibility and get jobs. Musically, the song, like many others on Beat Crazy, is more reggae-influenced than songs on Jackson's previous two albums. Unlike many other songs by Jackson, the lead vocals are performed by bassist Graham Maby with Jackson on supporting vocals. The vocals also feature an echo effect.

"Beat Crazy" saw a single release in January 1981 as the second single from Beat Crazy (the first being "Mad at You," which did not chart). Backed with a rerecording of Jackson's first hit, "Is She Really Going Out With Him?," the song failed to chart. A third single, "One to One," also failed commercially.

== Reception ==
Upon its release as a single, Gavin Martin of NME remarked that "Beat Crazy" "sounds too much like self-conscious, time-killing adult pop". He noted Graham Maby's "wispy quavering vocals", the "wobbly, restrained tribal offbeat" and a lyric of "zany hedonistic youths brightening up dull concrete thoroughfares", told [using] the persona of a passive disorientated observer". Mark Ellen, writing for Smash Hits, felt it was "wise to ignore Joe's caustic jibes about the slaves of fashion and just succumb to the forceful reggae-boned attack".

"Beat Crazy" was retrospectively described by AllMusic reviewer Chris True as Jackson's "first real attempt at breaking out of his quasi-snide power pop and bringing in other styles and musical forms to add depth to his work." He continues, saying, "He pulls it off fairly well, he is a pretty good songwriter and has a great ear for sound and production, but, as stated before, reggae was already a minor element in rock at the time, so it doesn't really make or break the song, it’s just a small step into new ground."

The song is also a personal favorite of Joe Jackson's. On his official website, Jackson, who felt that the Beat Crazy album was mixed, said, "There’s some good stuff on it," later saying, "I especially like the title track and 'Biology'."

== Personnel ==
- Joe Jackson - supporting vocals
- Graham Maby - lead vocals, bass
- Gary Sanford - guitar
- Dave Haughton - drums

== Charts ==
Chart (1981)	Peak position
UK Record Business Singles Top 100	100
