= One to One (Joe Jackson Band song) =

1980 song by Joe Jackson Band

Single by Joe Jackson Band

from the album Beat Crazy
- B-side: "Someone Up There"
- Released: November 1980
- Length: 3:21
- Label: A&M
- Songwriter(s): Joe Jackson
- Producer(s): Joe Jackson

Joe Jackson Band singles chronology
"Pretty Boys" (1980)	"One to One" (1980)	"Beat Crazy" (1981)

"One to One" is a song by the Joe Jackson Band, released as the third single from Jackson's third studio album Beat Crazy (1980). The song was written and produced by Jackson. It was released as a single in the US and Canada in 1980 and the UK and Australia in 1981. It failed to enter the UK Singles Chart, but did reach number 123 on the Record Business Singles Chart.

== Background ==
Lyrically, "One to One" is sung by the narrator to a female partner who is preoccupied with supporting various political causes. Although the narrator agrees with her political beliefs, he does not have the same desire to "wear a badge" or "wave a banner" and wishes for more personal commitment from her. Speaking of the song, Jackson told Melody Maker in 1980,

"It's about how people sometimes get so hung up on political ideology that they forget the importance of one to one relationships. Like one person in the song is saying 'Sit down, I want to talk to you,' and the other person is saying, 'Oh yeah. But what about saving the whale!' Personally I believe one to one things are far more important. Like you can go to a Rock Against Racism gig and be achieving nothing. To me that's not as important as being able to have a conversation in the pub with a black person. So I'm just trying to push the more individual aspects of it all."

"One to One" was released as the lead single from Beat Crazy in the US and Canada in November 1980. It was released in the UK as the album's third and final single on 13 March 1981.

== Critical reception ==
Upon its release as a single in the US, Cash Box praised "One to One" as an "affecting plea to a socially conscious (and active) lover to keep it 'one to one'" and felt it shows Jackson to be "a romanticist deep at heart". In a review of its UK release, Mark Dawson of the Sunday Sun noted that Jackson "says something important about human existence" on the track and added, "Not only does Jackson make great music, he also holds a place in his heart for the transitory blessings of pop music." A reviewer for the Evening Chronicle described it as a "slowish, angular song with clever lyrics and piano backing", but added they "much prefer the B-side". Paul Walker of the Sandwell Evening Mail considered it a "good song" from an "excellent artist", but added it was "not distinctive enough" and felt Jackson would be better releasing new material than further tracks from Beat Crazy.

David Hepworth of Smash Hits was mixed in his review. He described the song as "a low key, slightly disturbing lament which leans on a finely chiselled piano figure and tells its story of a relationship devoured by slogans". He felt that the problem was Jackson "seems to be overdoing the vocal, stumbling over the words and generally coming over all clumsy". Rosalind Russell of Record Mirror wrote, "Joe's conscience is getting a bit too heavy for us all to carry [and] his preoccupation with the deeper meanings of life is becoming tiresome. It's not easy putting political perspectives onto a three minute slice of the action, and he has by no means succeeded here."

== Track listing ==
7–inch single (US)

1. "One to One" – 3:21
2. "Enough Is Not Enough" – 3:06

7–inch single (Canada)

1. "One to One" – 3:21
2. "Mad at You" – 6:00

7–inch single (UK and Australia)

1. "One to One" – 3:21
2. "Someone Up There" – 3:47

== Personnel ==
Joe Jackson Band

- Joe Jackson – vocals, piano, keyboards
- Gary Sanford – guitar
- Graham Maby – bass
- Dave Houghton – drums

Production

- Joe Jackson – producer
- Norman Mighell – engineer
- Nigel Mills – assistant engineer

Other

- Anton Corbijn – photography

== Charts ==
Chart (1981)	Peak position
UK Record Business Singles Chart	123
