= Night and Day (Joe Jackson album) =

1982 studio album by Joe Jackson

Studio album by Joe Jackson
- Released: 25 June 1982
- Recorded: January–February 1982
- Studios: Blue Rock (SoHo, New York City)
- Genres: New wave; sophisti-pop
- Length: 42:42
- Label: A&M
- Producers: David Kershenbaum; Joe Jackson

Joe Jackson chronology
Jumpin' Jive (1981)	Night and Day (1982)	Mike's Murder (1983)

Singles from Night and Day
- 1. "Real Men" Released: 11 June 1982; 2. "Breaking Us in Two" Released: 13 August 1982; 3. "Steppin' Out" Released: 22 October 1982; 4. "Another World (non-UK single)" Released: 1983; 5. "A Slow Song" Released: June 1983

Professional ratings
Review scores
Source	Rating
AllMusic	4.5/5 stars
Christgau's Record Guide	B−
The Encyclopedia of Popular Music	5/5 stars
Melody Maker	3/5 stars
Q	4/5 stars
Record Mirror	3/5 stars
Rolling Stone	4/5 stars
The Rolling Stone Album Guide	4/5 stars
Sounds	3.5/5 stars

Night and Day is the fifth studio album by English musician Joe Jackson, released on 25 June 1982 by A&M Records. It reached the top five in both the United Kingdom and United States, Jackson's only studio album to do so in either country. The album has been certified gold in the UK and US, and achieved platinum status in Canada. It has sold over one million copies.

The album pays tribute to the wit and style of Cole Porter (and indirectly to New York City). The track "Real Men" pointed obliquely to the city's early-1980s gay culture.

"Steppin' Out" earned Grammy Award nominations for Record of the Year and Best Pop Vocal Performance, Male. It reached number 6 on both the UK and the US charts. "Breaking Us in Two" reached number 18 in the US and number 59 in the UK.

Jackson released a sequel to the album entitled Night and Day II in October 2000.

== Reissues ==
In 1997, A&M released a digitally remastered CD manufactured in Europe. Not only were the tracks remastered, but "Another World" has an extra two bars in the intro. The crossfades for the songs were also re-created.

In 2003, A&M released a deluxe version of the album with a bonus disc consisting of live tracks, demos, and songs Jackson recorded for the 1984 film Mike's Murder.

== Track listing ==
=== Original LP ===
All tracks are written by Joe Jackson, except where noted.

Night Side
No.	Title	Length
1.	"Another World"	4:00
2.	"Chinatown"	4:08
3.	"T.V. Age" (music by Jackson and Steve Tatler)	3:45
4.	"Target"	3:52
5.	"Steppin' Out"	4:34

Day Side
No.	Title	Length
6.	"Breaking Us in Two"	4:57
7.	"Cancer"	6:06
8.	"Real Men"	4:05
9.	"A Slow Song"	7:15

=== 2003 deluxe edition ===
In 2003, A&M released a remastered deluxe edition of Night and Day. All tracks were 96K/24-bit remastered from the original analog master tapes. This edition includes six demos, five tracks from Jackson's soundtrack to the film Mike's Murder and five tracks from the 1988 double live album Live 1980/86.

==== Disc one ====
No.	Title	Length
1.	"Another World"	4:00
2.	"Chinatown"	4:08
3.	"T.V. Age" (music by Jackson and Steve Tatler; lyrics by Jackson)	3:45
4.	"Target"	3:52
5.	"Steppin' Out"	4:34
6.	"Breaking Us in Two"	4:57
7.	"Cancer"	6:06
8.	"Real Men"	4:05
9.	"A Slow Song"	7:13

==== Disc two ====
Night and Day – Joe Jackson's Original Demos
No.	Title	Length
1.	"Steppin' Out"	4:14
2.	"Target"	4:11
3.	"Cancer"	4:23
4.	"Real Men"	4:20
5.	"Breaking Us in Two"	3:56
6.	"Chinatown"	3:05

Tracks from Mike's Murder soundtrack
No.	Title	Length
7.	"Cosmopolitan"	4:38
8.	"1-2-3 Go (This Town's a Fairground)"	3:02
9.	"Laundromat Monday"	3:33
10.	"Memphis"	4:46
11.	"Moonlight"	4:28

Live tracks from Live 1980/86
No.	Title	Length
12.	"On Your Radio"	5:07
13.	"Fools in Love"	7:44
14.	"Cancer"	8:26
15.	"Is She Really Going Out with Him" (a cappella version)	4:43
16.	"Look Sharp!"	4:29

== Personnel ==
Credits adapted from the liner notes of Night and Day.

=== Musicians ===
- Joe Jackson – arrangements, orchestration, piano, Fender Rhodes and Yamaha electric pianos, Hammond organ, GEM organ, Prophet-5 and Minimoog synthesisers, alto saxophone, vibes, lead vocals
- Graham Maby – bass, vocals, percussion
- Larry Tolfree – drums, timbales, percussion
- Sue Hadjopoulos – congas, bongos, timbales, orchestral bells, xylophone, miscellaneous percussion, flute, vocals
- Ricardo Torres – bongos, cowbell, claves (tracks 4, 7)
- Ed Roynesdal – violins (tracks 8, 9), synthesiser programming
- Al Weisman – background vocals
- Grace Millan – background vocals
- Jack Waldman – synthesiser programming

=== Technical ===
- David Kershenbaum – production, mixing
- Joe Jackson – production, mixing
- Michael Ewasko – engineering
- Ken Tracht – engineering assistance

=== Artwork ===
- Joe Jackson – art direction
- Paula Greif – coordination
- Philip Burke – artwork
- George Dubose – photography

== Charts ==
=== Weekly charts ===
Weekly chart performance for Night and Day
Chart (1982–1983)	Peak position
Australian Albums (Kent Music Report)	5
Canada Top Albums/CDs (RPM)	4
Dutch Albums (Album Top 100)	3
German Albums (Offizielle Top 100)	11
Italian Albums (Musica e dischi)	24
New Zealand Albums (RMNZ)	8
UK Albums (Official Charts)	3
US Billboard 200	4

=== Year-end sortable charts ===
1982 year-end chart performance for Night and Day
Chart (1982)	Position
Australian Albums (Kent Music Report)	22
Canada Top Albums/CDs (RPM)	40
Dutch Albums (Album Top 100)	20

1983 year-end chart performance for Night and Day
Chart (1983)	Position
Australian Albums (Kent Music Report)	77
Canada Top Albums/CDs (RPM)	57
Dutch Albums (Album Top 100)	13
German Albums (Offizielle Top 100)	71
New Zealand Albums (RMNZ)	42
UK Albums (Gallup)	64
US Billboard 200	22

== Certifications ==
Certifications for Night and Day
Region	Certification	Certified units/sales
Australia (ARIA)	Platinum	50,000^{^}
Canada (Music Canada)	Platinum	100,000^{^}
Netherlands (NVPI)	Platinum	100,000^{^}
New Zealand (RMNZ)	Gold	7,500^{^}
United Kingdom (BPI)	Gold	100,000^{^}
United States (RIAA)	Gold	500,000^{^}
^{^} Shipments figures based on certification alone.
