= Steppin' Out (Joe Jackson song) =

- Artwork for UK vinyl releases; other editions that use this artwork have various B-side tracks

Single by Joe Jackson

from the album Night and Day
- B-side: "Another World" (UK 7-inch); "Chinatown" (U.S. 7-inch)
- Released: August 1982 (US); 22 October 1982 (UK)
- Recorded: January 1982
- Studio: Blue Rock, New York City
- Genre: New wave; synth-pop; electropop; sophisti-pop
- Length: 4:23 (album version); 3:43 (single version)
- Label: A&M
- Songwriter: Joe Jackson
- Producers: David Kershenbaum; Joe Jackson

Joe Jackson singles chronology
"Real Men" (1982)	"Steppin' Out" (1982)	"Breaking Us in Two" (1983)

Music video
- "Steppin' Out" on YouTube

"Steppin' Out" is a song by English musician Joe Jackson, originally included on his 1982 album Night and Day. The song, inspired by Jackson's time in New York City, was his highest-charting single in the United States, where it peaked at number 6 on the Billboard Hot 100. It reached the same position in Jackson's native UK.

== Background ==
The song is about the anticipation and excitement of a night out on the town. Released as a single in early August 1982, it became Jackson's biggest hit in the United States, peaking at No. 5 in Cashbox magazine and No. 6 on the Billboard Hot 100 for four consecutive weeks from 11 December 1982, to 1 January 1983.

It also reached No. 4 on Billboard's Hot Adult Contemporary Tracks and No. 7 on Billboard's Album Rock Tracks. The song was released as a single in the UK on 22 October 1982. It became Jackson's second biggest hit on the UK singles chart, where it reached No. 6 in December 1982. Only "It's Different for Girls", which reached No. 5 in the UK in 1980, did better.

During his 2019 tour for the album Fool, Jackson stated he played all the instruments on "Steppin' Out" – with the exception of session drummer Larry Tolfree, who added a real snare drum and cymbal hits. The rest of the song's drum beat was programmed into a 1979 Korg KR-55 drum machine, the original of which Jackson used on the 2019 tour to play the song.

== Music video ==
The music video for the song, directed by Steve Barron, featured a blonde, attractive hotel maid fantasising that she is a Cinderella figure. It was filmed over one night in the St. Regis Hotel in New York City during the summer of 1982. The video used the shorter single version instead of the full album version. According to an interview with Time Out, Jackson made the music video against his wishes. "Rock 'n' roll is degenerating into a big circus, and videos and MTV are very much part of that," he said.

== Personnel ==
- Joe Jackson – lead vocals, piano, Hammond organ, Minimoog, vibraphone, drum programming
- Larry Tolfree – drums

== Accolades ==
"Steppin' Out" earned two Grammy nominations in 1983, for Record of the Year and Best Male Pop Vocal Performance. The song lost to Toto's "Rosanna" and Lionel Richie's "Truly", respectively.

== Reception ==
AllMusic journalist Chris True praised the song as a "mélange of simple piano hooks, rudimentary electronic treatment and classic vocal pop, with a rhythm track that is quaint in its simplicity and driving enough to invoke images of the big city at night".

In 2015 Pitchfork Media placed "Steppin' Out" at 153 on its list of "The 200 Greatest Songs of the 1980s." In 2022, Rolling Stone ranked it 93 on their list "100 Best Songs of 1982". Glide Magazine ranked it as Jackson's second best song.

== Chart history ==
=== Weekly charts ===
Chart (1982–1983)	Peak position
Australia (Kent Music Report)	30
Canada Top Singles (RPM)	5
Ireland (IRMA)	5
Netherlands (Tipparade)	12
New Zealand (Recorded Music NZ)	21
UK Singles (Official Charts)	6
US Billboard Hot 100	6
US Adult Contemporary (Billboard)	4
US Mainstream Rock (Billboard)	7
US Cash Box Top 100	5
US Radio & Records CHR/Pop Airplay Chart	2
West Germany (GfK)	28

=== Year-end charts ===
Chart (1982)	Rank
Canada	52
US Cash Box	32

Chart (1983)	Rank
US Billboard Hot 100	82
