= Vinnie Zummo =

Guitarist in New York City

Vinnie Zummo is a New York City session guitarist. He has also worked as a producer, writer, arranger, and sound designer. Zummo worked with Joe Jackson for seven years. He played on six Jackson albums and three world tours. He has also worked with various other popular artists.

Zummo was heard on the 1984 song "You Can't Get What You Want (Till You Know What You Want)" on Jackson’s album Body and Soul. The song reached #15 on the Billboard Hot 100 chart in the United States.

Zummo has been a featured guitar soloist on numerous albums, including Art Garfunkel (Up 'til Now), Shawn Colvin (Fat City), Roger Daltrey (Rocks in the Head), Paul Carrack (Groove Approved), Marti Jones (Birthday Suit), Dee Carstensen (Regarding The Soul), Nenad Bach (Greatest Hits), Dawn Avery (True), Jamie de Roy (The Child In Me Vol. 1 & 2), Danny Wilensky (And Then Some), and Leslie Nuss (Action Hero Superstar) as well as the self produced Modern Marriage by The Zummos on A&M Records. Recently, Zummo contributed guitar to the song "No Hero" from the eponymously-titled album from the band Orbis Max (2023).

His work has been featured in the TV show "Ray Donovan", and movies such as Iron Man 3, The Weather Man, and Must Love Dogs and has been featured in many rock and jazz magazines.

Zummo has eight solo albums available: Swinging Guitar Sounds of Young America Volumes 1, 2 and 3, Retro Cool Bossa Nova Christmas Volumes 1 and 2, Retro Cool Mixed Bag Christmas, The Coyote, and Jazz Album. All About Jazz said about The Coyote: "It's a remarkable sound, and it elevates the proceedings into a different class from the average bebop guitar album."

Zummo has created custom hip-hop drum loops, and plays accordion and chromatic harmonica. He is a longtime resident of New York.
