= Tenth Avenue (Manhattan) =

North-south avenue in Manhattan, New York

- Amsterdam Avenue (north of 59th Street)
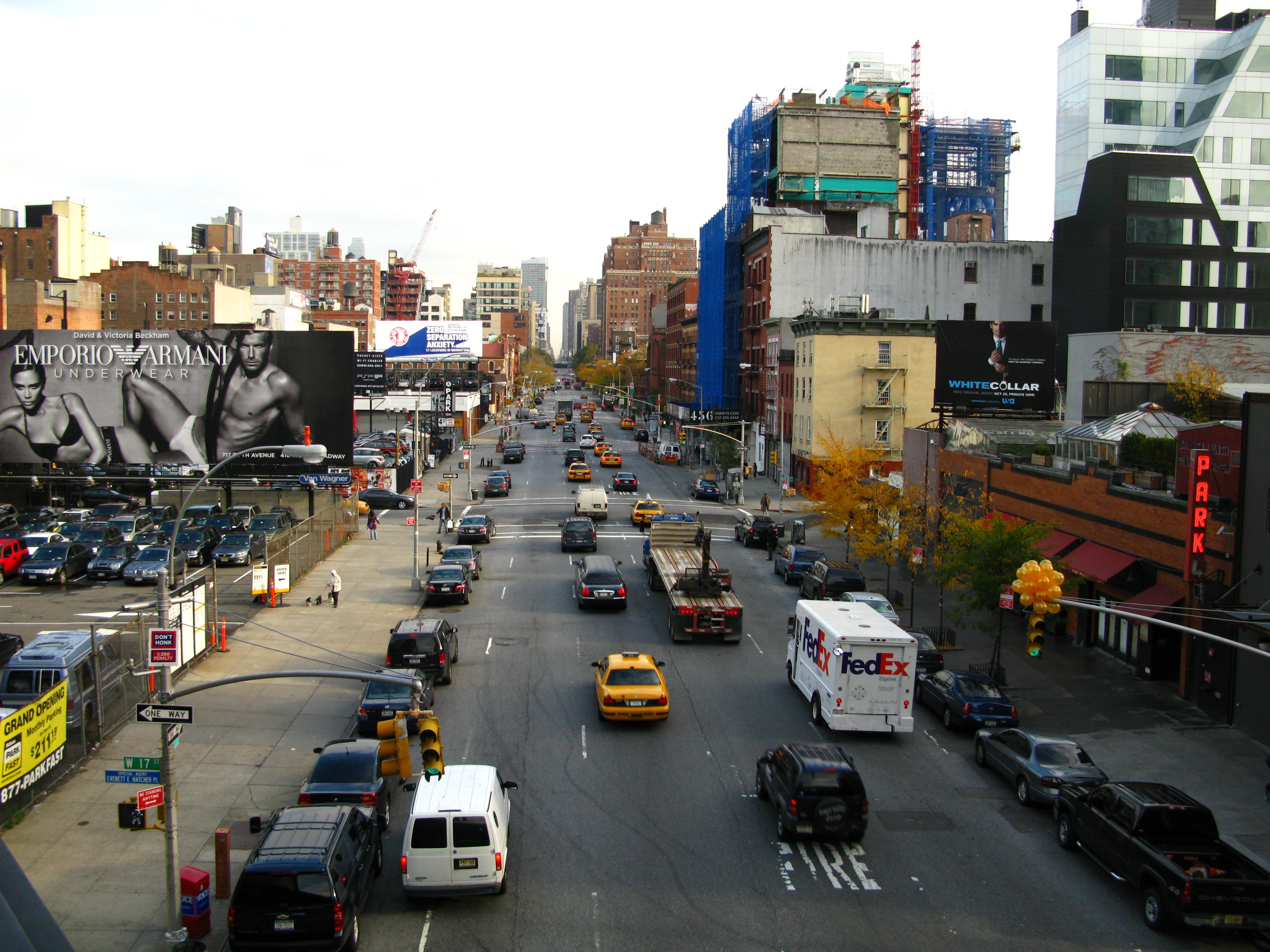
- Tenth Avenue at 17th Street, as seen from the High Line
- Owner: City of New York
- Maintained by: NYCDOT
- Length: 10.5 mi (16.9 km)
- Location: Manhattan, New York City, U.S.
- South end: NY 9A / West Side Highway
- North end: Fort George Avenue
- East: Ninth Avenue (below 59th St); Columbus Avenue (above 59th St)
- West: Eleventh Avenue (below 59th St); West End Avenue (above 59th St)

Construction
- Commissioned: March 1811

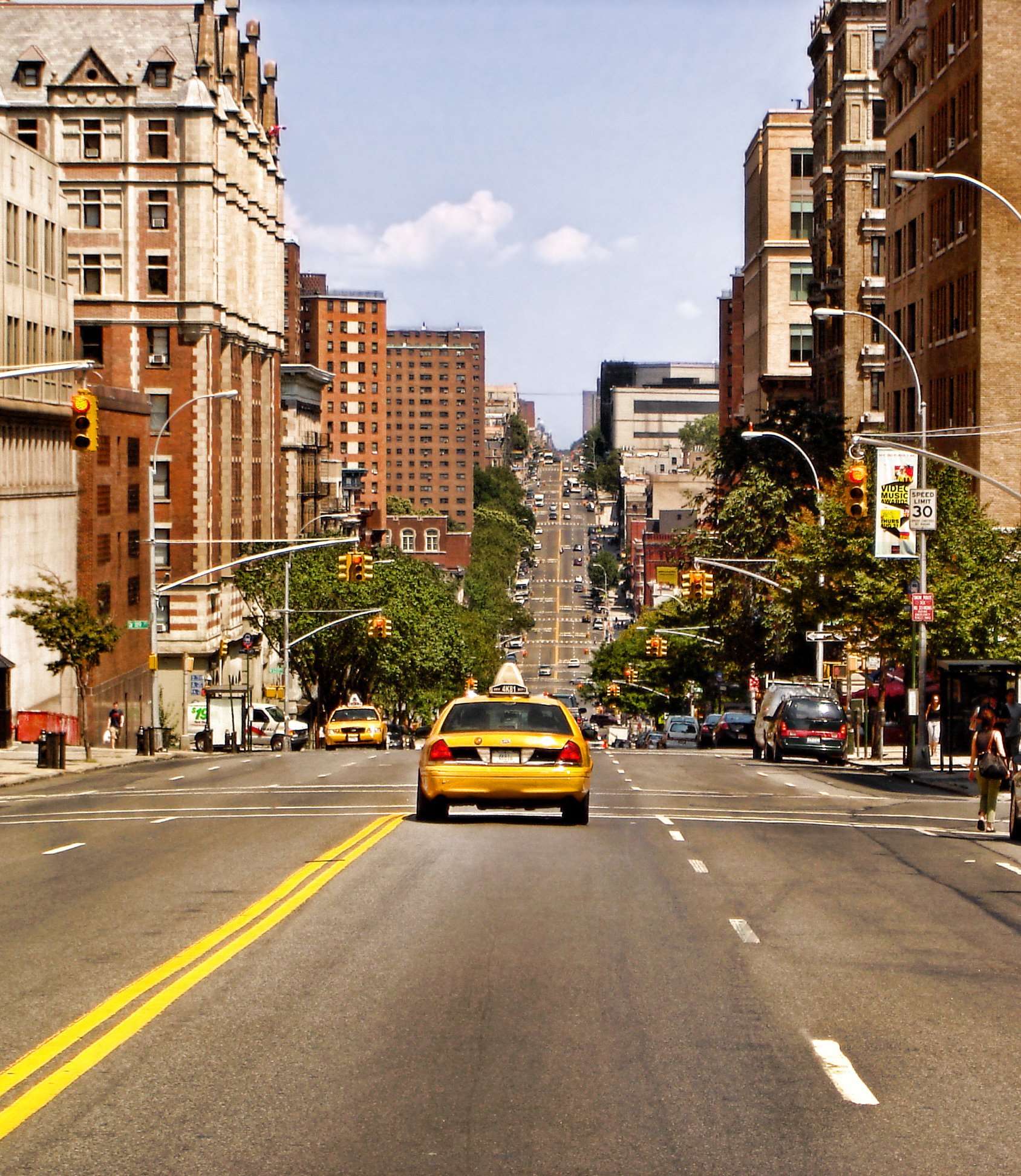
Amsterdam Avenue looking north from 119th Street toward Harlem

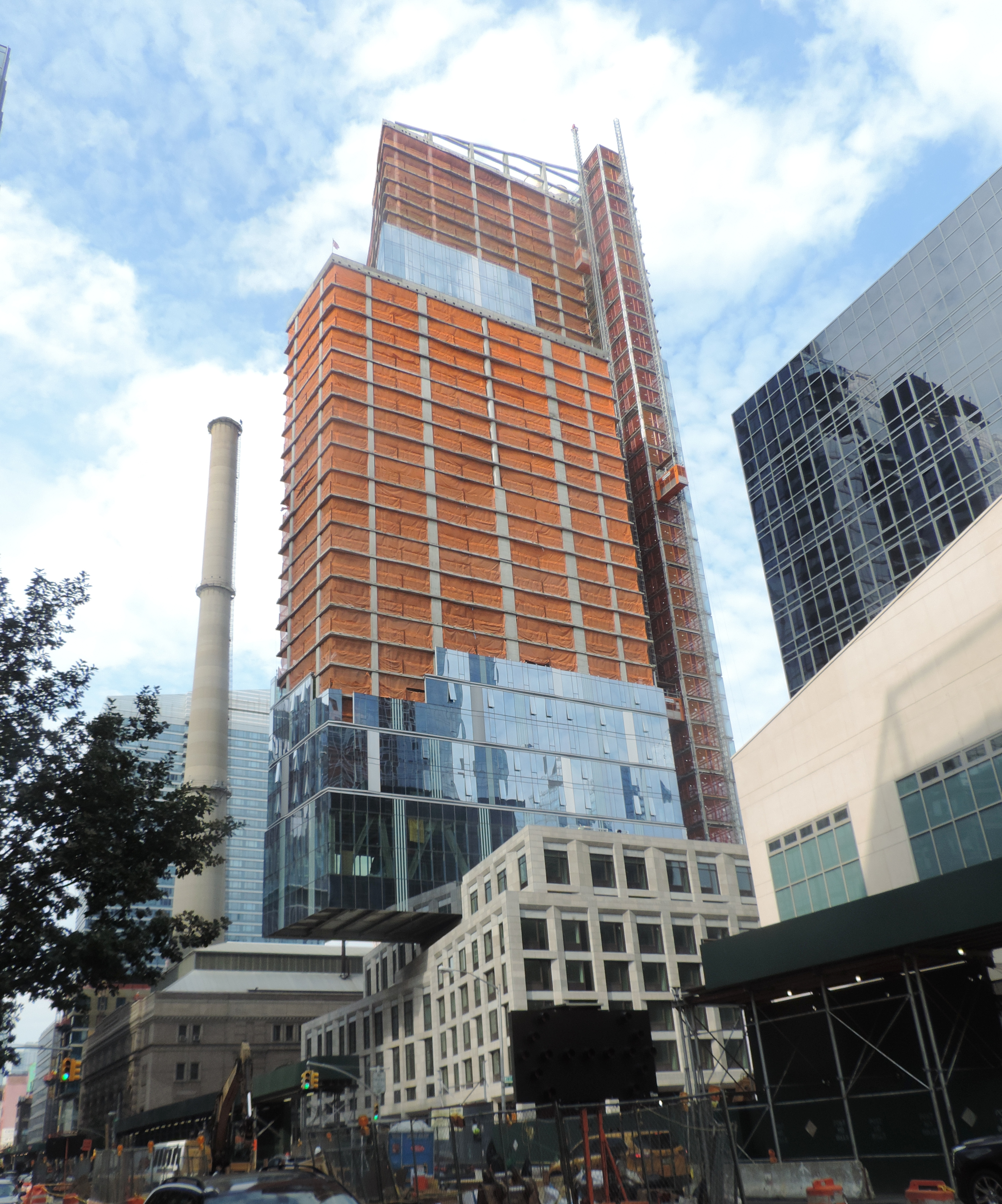
New residential tower at 60th Street

Tenth Avenue, known as Amsterdam Avenue between 59th Street and 193rd Street, is a north-south thoroughfare on the West Side of Manhattan in New York City. It carries uptown (northbound) traffic as far as West 110th Street (also known as Cathedral Parkway), after which it continues as a two-way street.

== Geography ==
Tenth Avenue begins a block below Gansevoort Street and Eleventh Avenue in the West Village / Meatpacking District. For the southernmost stretch (the four blocks below 14th Street), Tenth Avenue runs southbound. North of 14th Street, Tenth Avenue runs uptown (northbound) for 45 blocks as a one-way street. At its intersection with 59th Street, it becomes Amsterdam Avenue and continues as a one-way street northbound until 110th Street (Cathedral Parkway), where two-way traffic resumes.

As Amsterdam Avenue, the thoroughfare stretches 129 blocks north – narrowing to one lane in each direction as it passes through Yeshiva University's Wilf Campus, between 184th and 186th Streets – before connecting with Fort George Avenue south of Highbridge Park at West 193rd Street.

On the north side of Highbridge Park, unconnected to Amsterdam Avenue on the south side, Tenth Avenue then runs for slightly less than a mile from the northern terminus of the Harlem River Drive at Dyckman Street, to the intersection of West 218th Street where it merges into Broadway.

== History ==
Tenth Avenue runs through the Chelsea and Hell's Kitchen neighborhoods on the west side of the borough, and then as Amsterdam Avenue, through the Upper West Side, Morningside Heights, Harlem, and Washington Heights. Much of these areas were working-class or poor for much of the 20th century. The street has long been noted for its commercial traffic. The street had grade-level railroad lines through the early 20th century.

The Hudson River Railroad's West Side Line ran along Tenth Avenue from its intersection with West Street to the upper city station at 34th Street, after which it veered to Eleventh Avenue; the line was completed to Peekskill, New York in 1849. Over this part of the right-of-way, the rails were laid at grade along the streets, and since by the corporation regulations locomotives were not allowed, the cars were drawn by a dummy engine, which, according to an 1851 description, consumed its own smoke. While passing through the city the train of cars was preceded by a man on horseback known as a "West Side cowboy" or "Tenth Avenue cowboy" who gave notice of its approach by blowing a horn. However, so many accidents occurred between freight trains and other traffic that the nickname "Death Avenue" was given to both Tenth and Eleventh Avenues.

Public debate about the hazard began during the early 1900s. In 1929, the city, the state, and New York Central agreed on the West Side Improvement Project, conceived by Robert Moses. The 13-mile (21 km) project eliminated 105 street-level railroad crossings and added 32 acres (13 ha) to Riverside Park; it also included construction of the West Side Elevated Highway. It cost more than $150 million (about $2 billion in 2017 dollars).

The part of Tenth Avenue north of West 59th Street was renamed "Amsterdam Avenue" in 1890 at the request of local merchants seeking to distance themselves from "Death Avenue" and to increase the value of their properties in an area that had yet to "catch on". The name was intended to recall the Dutch roots of Manhattan's earliest colonization in the 17th century, when the city was known as New Amsterdam. They hoped that the area would become a "the New City" and a "new, New Amsterdam". The Board of Alderman approved the name change, but only after first considering "Holland Avenue"; the change was made just before the vote on the resolution. In their approval, the Board noted that other name changes in the area, including that of Eleventh Avenue to West End Avenue, had "a marked and beneficial effect on property" and that they held such name changes "as second in importance only to the advantages of increased rapid transit."

The Fort George Amusement Park, now a seating area in Highbridge Park, was located at the northern end of Amsterdam Avenue from 1895 to 1914.

Tenth Avenue and Amsterdam Avenue were converted to carry one-way traffic northbound in two stages. South of its intersection with Broadway, the avenue was converted on November 6, 1948. The remainder, to 110th Street, was converted on December 6, 1951. Amsterdam Avenue continues to carry two-way traffic north of 110th Street.

During the real estate boom of the late 20th century, Amsterdam Avenue from roughly 59th Street to 96th Street became one of the city's most expensive residential districts.

== Transportation ==
Downtown buses use 9th Avenue unless specified below:

- The M11 runs from West 14th to West 135th Streets, with service north of West 110th Street operated in both directions. It is joined with the M12 and M14D SBS south of West 15th Street.
- The M31 runs from West 54th to West 57th Streets, with downtown buses serving 11th Avenue.
- The M7 runs from Broadway to West 106th Street.
- The M79 SBS runs from West 79th to West 81st Streets.
- The M60 SBS runs in both directions between West 120th and West 125th Streets.
- The M104 runs on two portions of Amsterdam Avenue: from Broadway to West 73rd Street, and from West 125th to West 129th Streets, using Broadway and crossing on West 125th downtown, respectively.
- The M100 also runs on two portions. One is on the entire portion of 10th Avenue north of Highbridge Park, with downtown service originating at West 215th Street. The other is on Amsterdam between West 125th Street and either West 163rd Street (uptown) or Saint Nicholas Avenue (downtown).
- The M101 serves Amsterdam in both directions between West 125th and West 190th Streets, with uptown service extended to Fort George Avenue.
- The M3 provides additional service on Amsterdam Avenue north of West 190th Street, duplicating the uptown M101, and between West 155th Street and West 163rd or Saint Nicholas, duplicating the M100.
  - Both aforementioned buses in the Fort George area use Saint Nicholas Avenue downtown.
- The M2 runs from West 165th to West 168th Streets, with downtown buses serving Broadway.
- The M98 enters the Harlem River Drive from West 178th Street (downtown) or exits to West 179th Street (uptown), via Amsterdam Avenue.

As part of the 7 Subway Extension, the New York City Subway's 7 and <7> trains were extended to 34th Street in 2015. An intermediate stop, Tenth Avenue, was originally planned but was dropped from the official plans in 2008. The 1 train serves two stations along the Inwood portion of Tenth Avenue: 207th Street and 215th Street. The IND Eighth Avenue Line has a station at 163rd Street

A protected bike lane was installed in 2016 from 72nd Street to 110th Street. In August 2023, work began on a 10-foot-wide (3.0 m) protected bike lane from 38th to 52nd Street, which was completed that December. Subsequently, the bike lane was extended between 14th and 38th Street in 2024.

== Notable sites ==
- Cathedral of St. John the Divine
- Chelsea Market
- City College of New York
- Columbia University
- Empire Diner
- General Theological Seminary
- High Line Park
- Hudson Yards Redevelopment Project
- John Jay College
- LaGuardia High School
- Lincoln Center for the Performing Arts
- Manhattan Plaza
- Martin Luther King Jr. Educational Campus
- Merchants Refrigerating Company Warehouse
- MiMA
- NewYork–Presbyterian Hospital
- Sherman Square
- Mount Sinai Morningside
- Verdi Square
- West-Park Presbyterian Church
- Yeshiva University

== Gallery ==
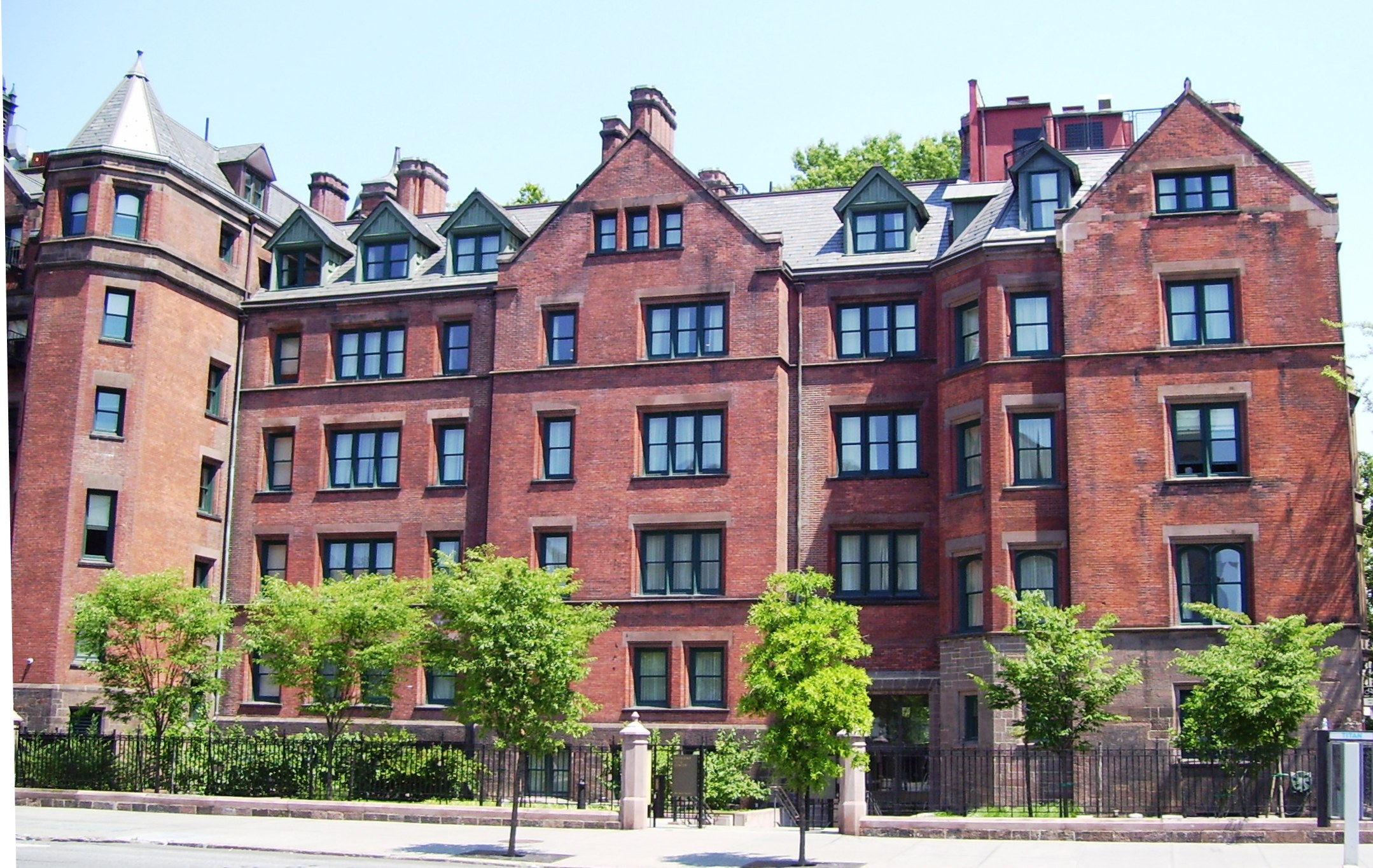
The Desmond Tutu Center of the General Theological Seminary at 20th–21st Streets

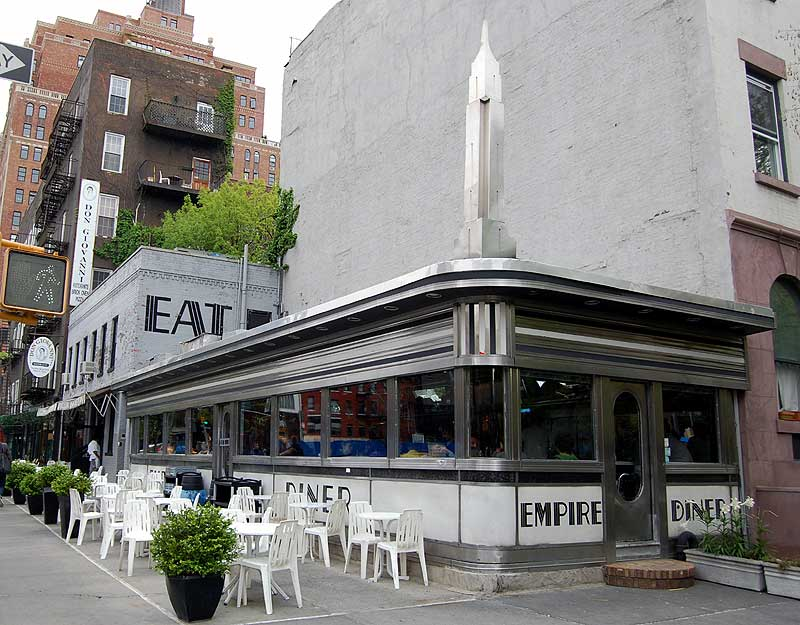
The Empire Diner at 22nd Street

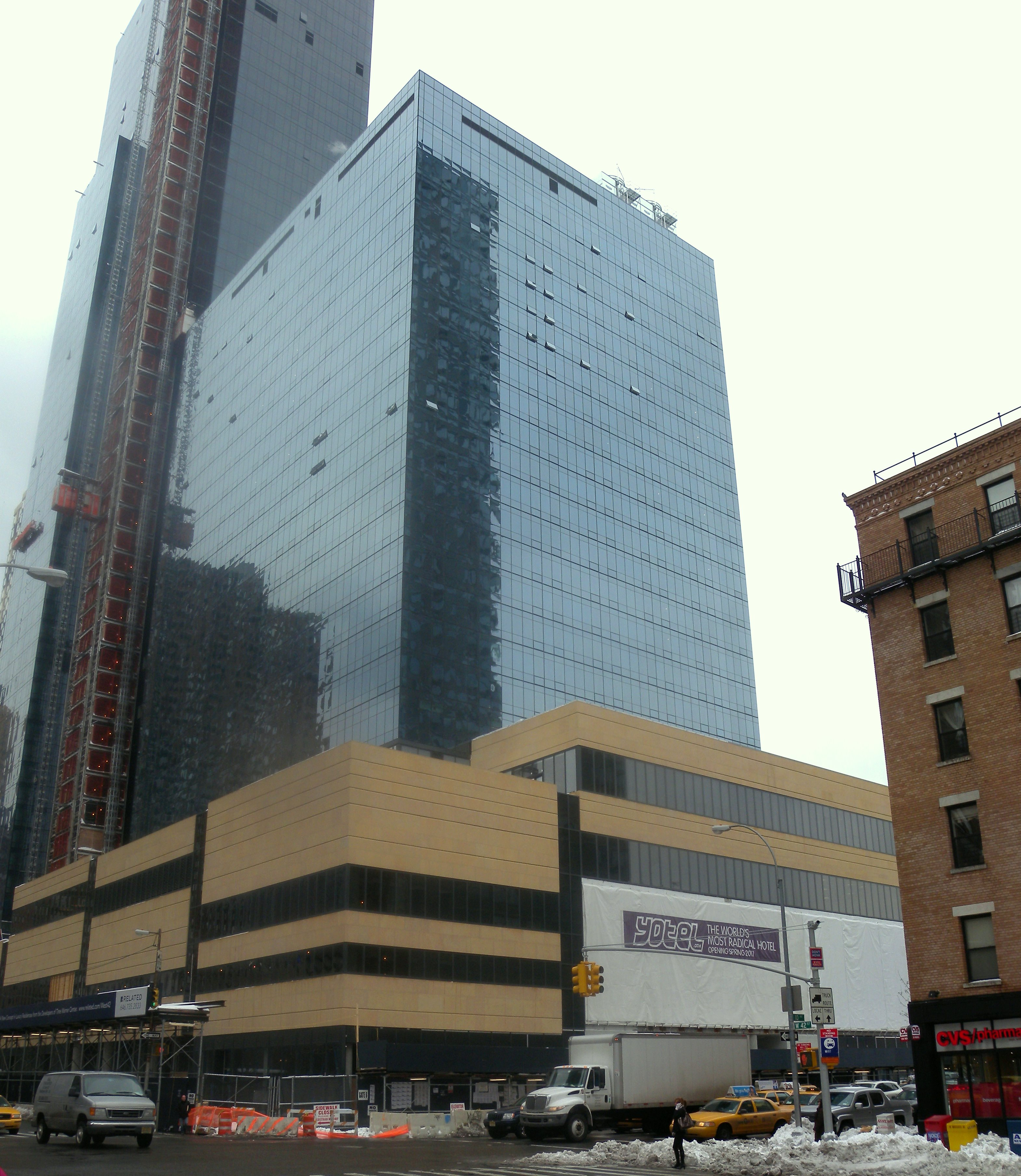
The Yotel and MiMA at 42nd Street

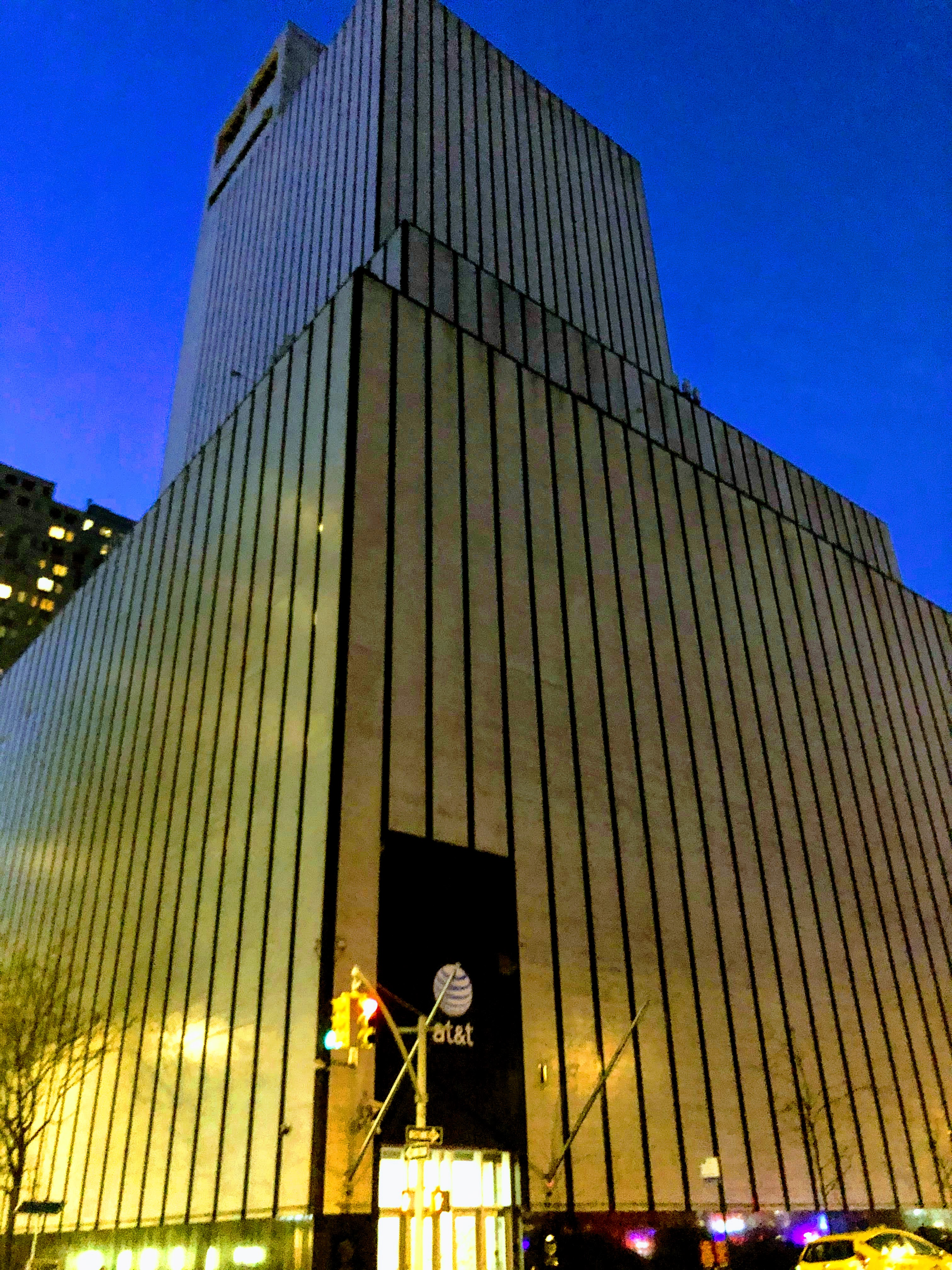
An AT&T building at 811 10th Avenue, at the corner of W. 53rd St.

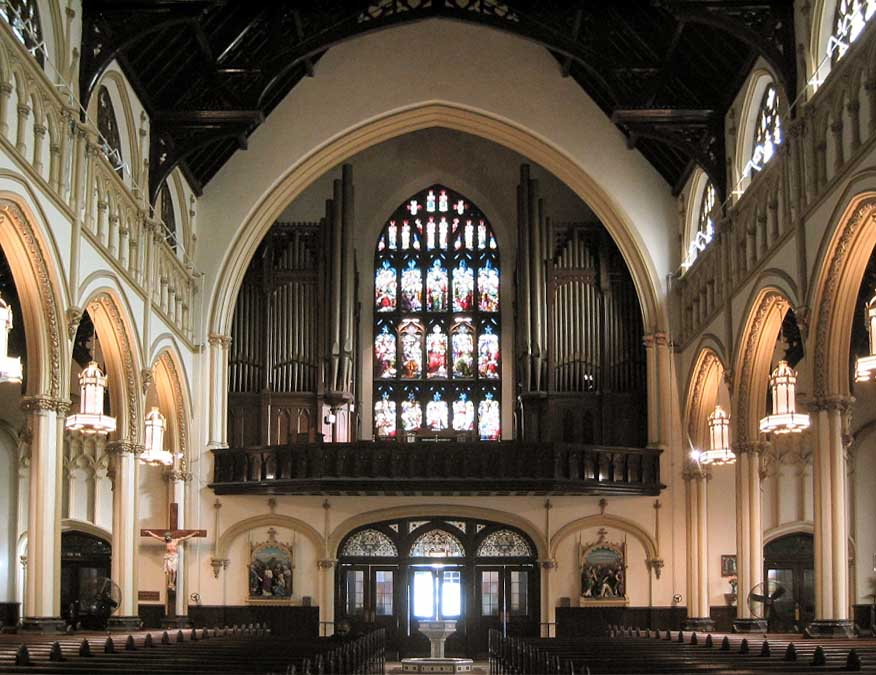
The interior of the Holy Name of Jesus Roman Catholic Church at 96th Street

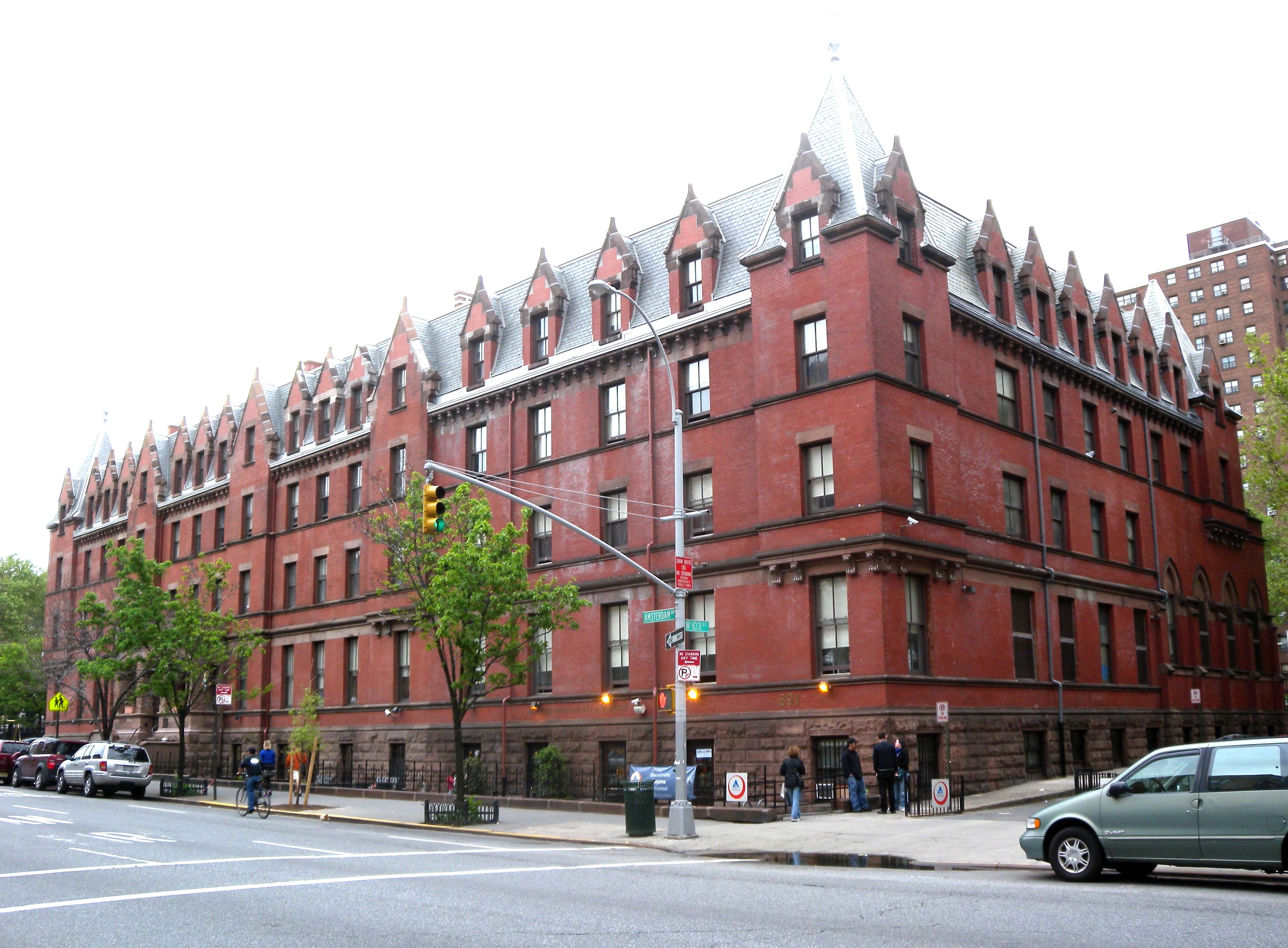
The American Youth Hostels building at 103rd Street

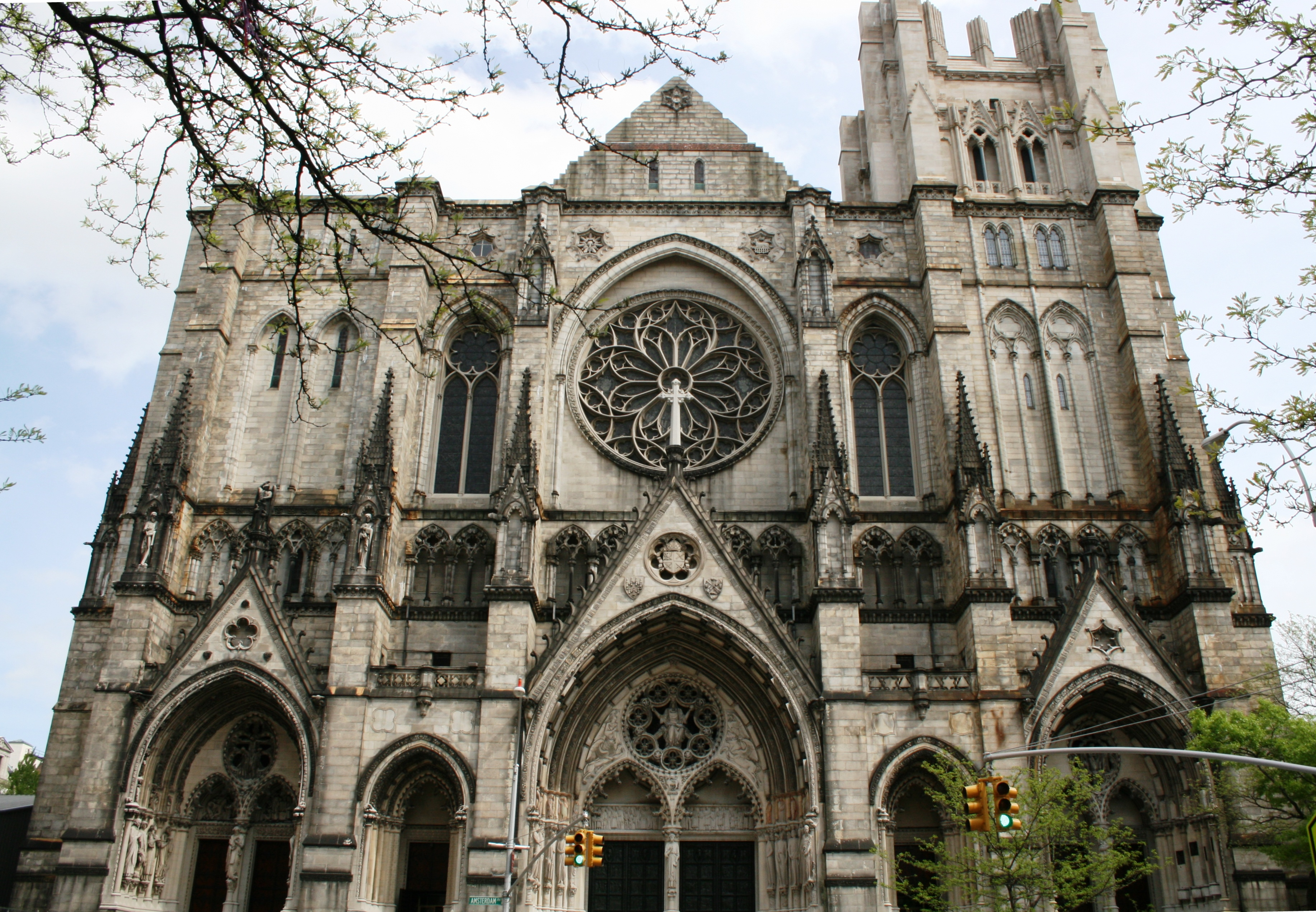
The Cathedral of St. John the Divine at 110th Street

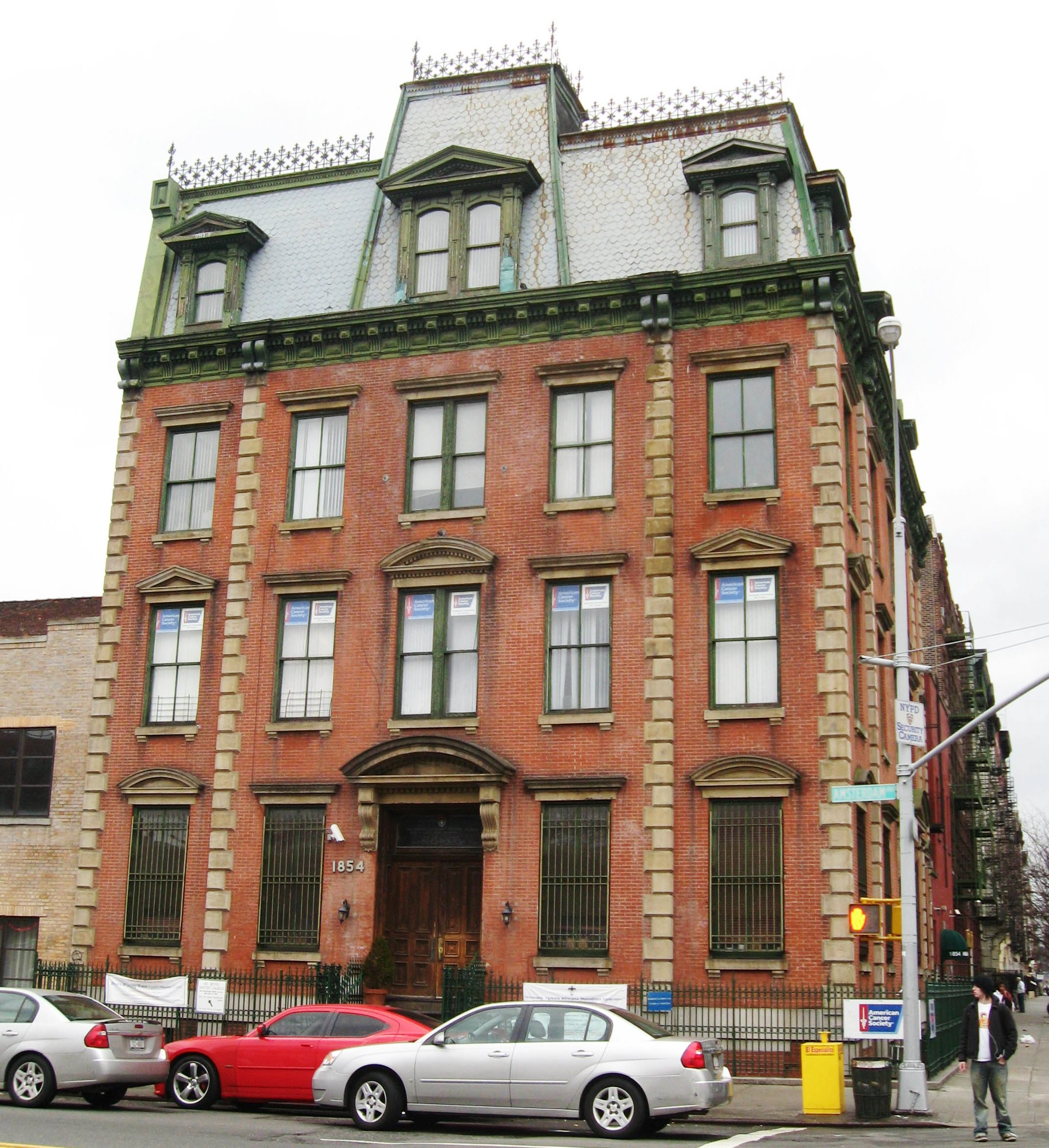
The former NYPD 32nd Police Precinct Station on Amsterdam Avenue at 152nd Street

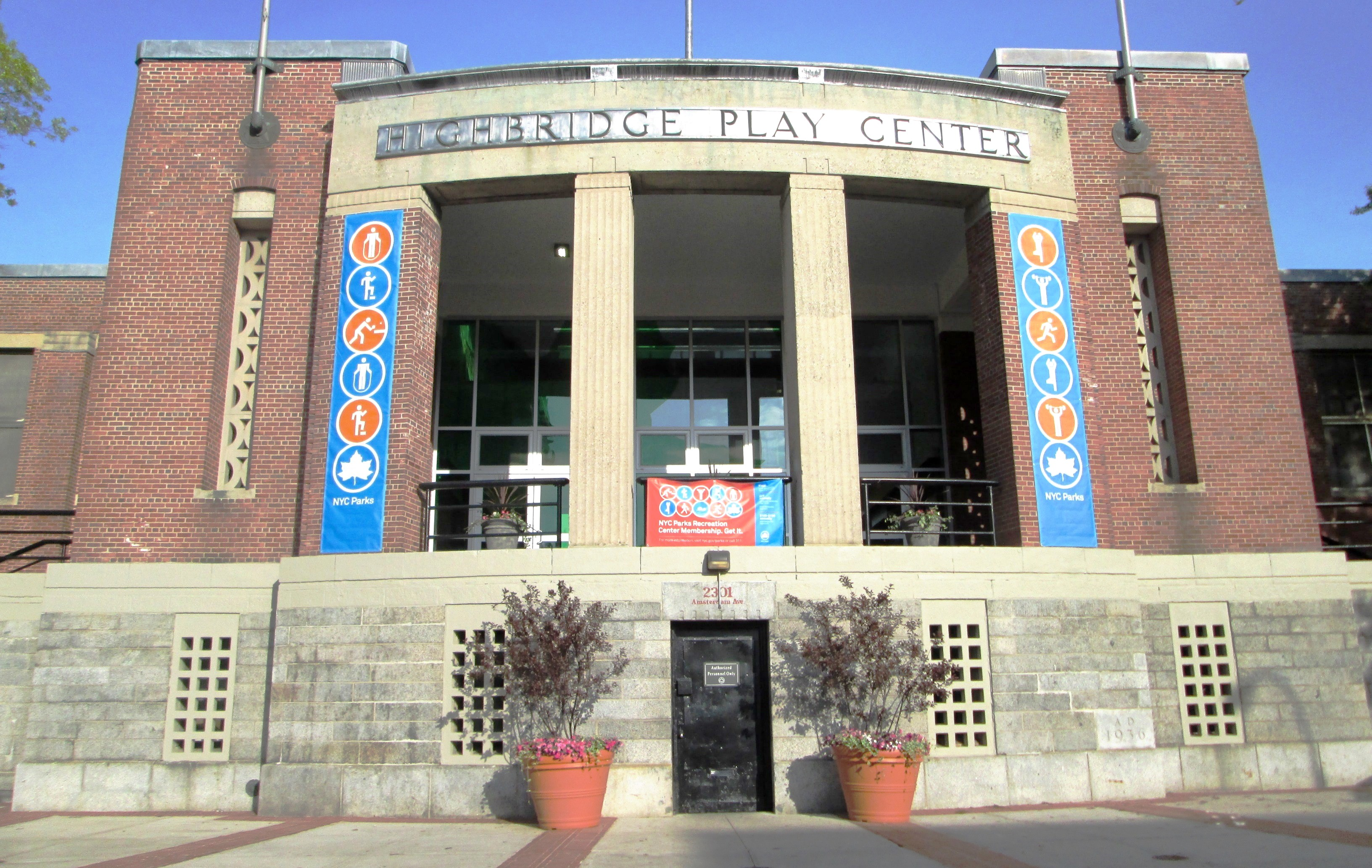
The Highbridge Play Center at 173rd Street

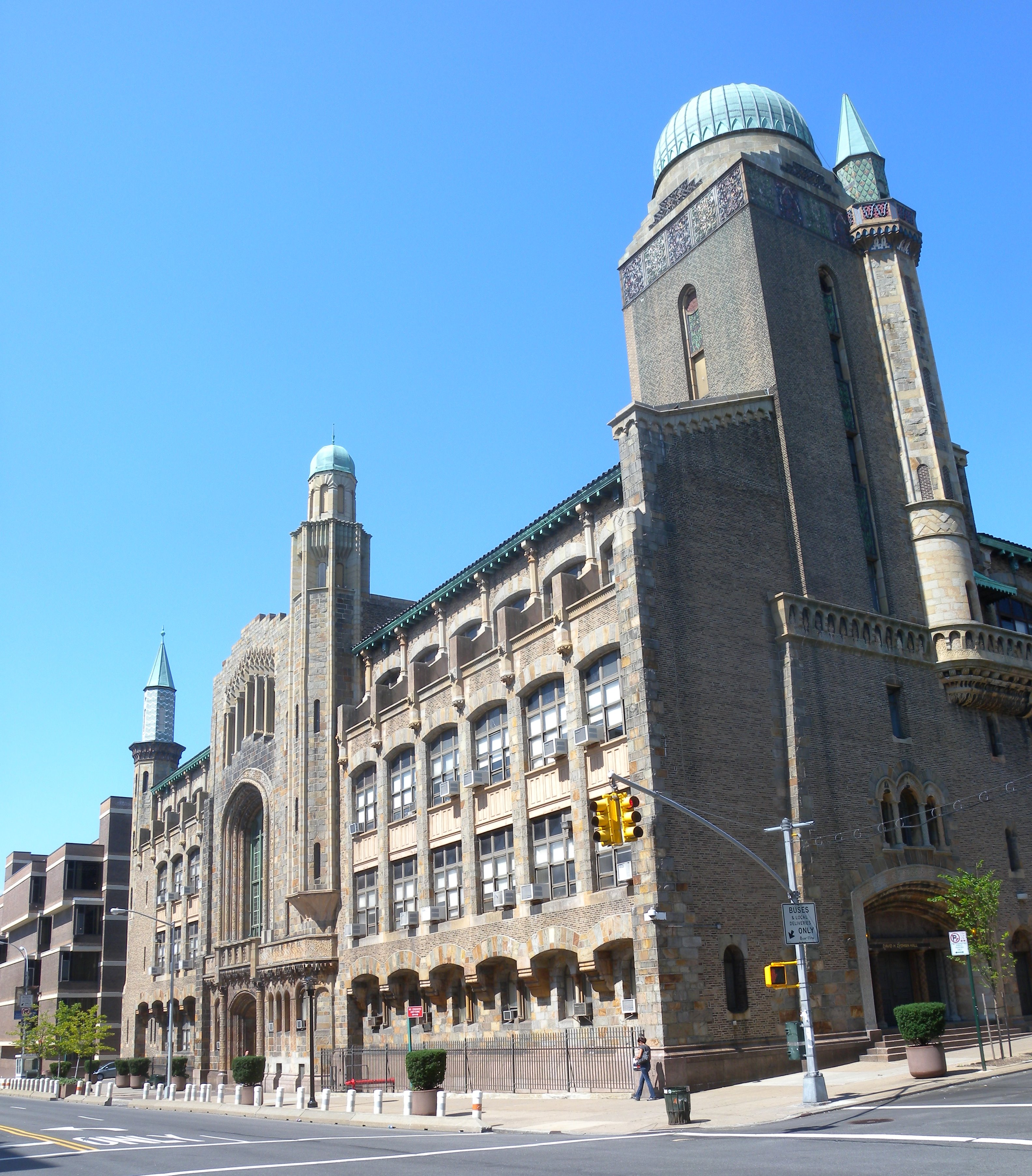
Zysman Hall of Yeshiva University, at 187th Street

== In popular culture ==
- The Rodgers and Hart play On Your Toes (1936) included the comic dance number "Slaughter on Tenth Avenue", performed by Ray Bolger and Tamara Geva. It was later performed on stage, film and television. It has been performed by the New York City Ballet, and was featured in the film version of On Your Toes, danced by Eddie Albert and Vera Zorina. In the biographical musical Words and Music (1948), a "Slaughter on Tenth Avenue" ballet sequence is performed by Gene Kelly and Vera-Ellen.
- The Girl from 10th Avenue is the name of a 1935 dramatic film starring Bette Davis.
- Slaughter on Tenth Avenue is also the name of a 1957 crime film and the debut album of Mick Ronson in 1974.
- In Moscow on the Hudson (1984), Robin Williams's character Vladimir Ivanoff lived on 1320 Amsterdam Avenue.
- In How I Met Your Mother, Ted Mosby is said to have lived near the corner of 75th Street and Amsterdam Avenue.
- In Donald E. Westlake's "Dortmunder" series of crime novels, the fictional O.J. Bar and Grill (the gang's favorite meeting place) is located on Amsterdam Avenue.
- In the "Asterisk" episode of the American TV drama Suits, Mike Ross mentions renting an apartment "off 10th Avenue", to which his colleague Rachel Zane replies, "Does it come with a bullet-proof vest?".
- Amsterdam Avenue is mentioned in the Joe Jackson song "Stranger Than You", from the album Night and Day II.
- Tenth Avenue Freeze-Out is a 1976 single by Bruce Springsteen.
