= YO! Company =

British holding company

- Company type: Private, Holding company
- Founded: 1997; 29 years ago
- Founder: Simon Woodroffe
- Headquarters: London, United Kingdom
- Owner: Simon Woodroffe
- Website: www.yo.co.uk

YO! Company is a British holding company wholly owned by entrepreneur Simon Woodroffe.

The YO! Company has several subsidiary companies and brands including:

- YOTEL - a chain of capsule hotels at airports and various cities
- YO! Japan - A Japanese-inspired clothing brand
- RadiYO! - a series of radio shows about business
- YO! Zone - spa and health club
- YO! Home - modern style city centre apartments
- In July 2016 Simon Woodroffe joined with British firm Glenn Howells Architects.

YO! Company formerly owned:

- YO! Sushi - a chain of sushi restaurants. Currently owned by Japanese foodservice company Zensho, through The Wonderfield Group.
