= MiMA (building) =

Residential skyscraper in Manhattan, New York

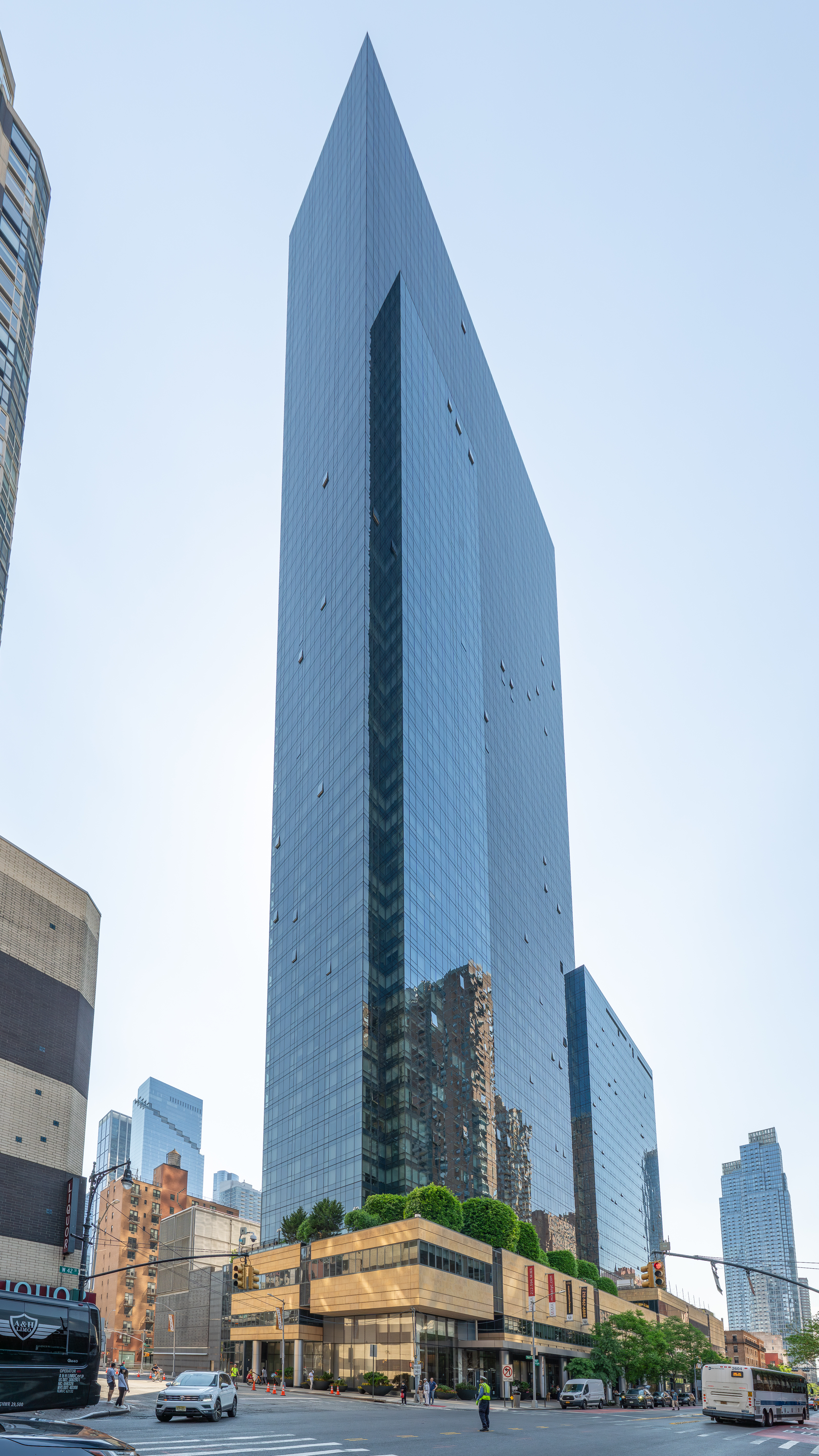
- (2026)
- Interactive map of the MiMA area

General information
- Type: Rental and condominium apartments (top), Hotel (bottom)
- Architectural style: Neomodern
- Location: 450 West 42nd Street, New York, NY, United States
- Coordinates: 40°45′33″N 73°59′42″W
- Construction started: 2007
- Completed: 2011

Height
- Roof: 204.2 m (670 ft)

Technical details
- Floor count: 63

Design and construction
- Architecture firm: Arquitectonica
- Developer: The Related Companies, L.P.
- Structural engineer: Rosenwasser Grossman Consulting Engineers
- Other designers: Rockwell Group
- Main contractor: Tishman Construction Corporation

MiMA, a stylized abbreviation of "Middle of Manhattan", is a mixed-use building located at 450 West 42nd Street between Dyer and 10th Avenues in the Hell's Kitchen neighborhood of Manhattan, New York City. Ground was broken in 2007 and topping out occurred in early August 2010. It was designed by the Miami-based architecture firm of Arquitectonica, and has 43 floors of luxury rentals on floors 7 to 50, twelve floors of condominiums on floors 51 to 63, and a Yotel hotel on the lower levels. At 638 feet (194 m), it is the 101st tallest building in New York.

The building was developed by The Related Companies and Stephen M. Ross, the company's founder, chairman and CEO, stated that the project "has been well received because of the amenity package...", which includes a private health club, an outdoor movie theatre, and Dog City, a dog run and full pet spa. MiMA is also one of the first buildings to have a distribution antenna system which improves cell phone service and reception throughout the building.

In 2012, the Signature Theatre Company opened The Pershing Square Signature Center, designed by Frank Gehry, inside the MiMA Building. The center consists of three theatre spaces, two studios, a shared lobby with a café and bar, bookshop, and concierge desk, and administrative offices that span 70,000 contiguous square feet.

MiMA's advertising campaign, carried out primarily on ads on bus shelters, suggested that "MiMA" was yet another Manhattan neighborhood acronym, like SoHo and TriBeCa.

== See also ==
- List of tallest buildings in New York City
