= Yotel =

British hotel chain

Coordinates: 51°31′4″N 0°9′7.5″W

- Product type: Hotels
- Current owner: Al-Bahar Group, United Investment Portugal, Kuwait Real Estate Company (AQARAT), Starwood Capital Group
- Introduced: 2007
- Related brands: Yotel Air, Yotel Pad
- Markets: United States, EMEA, Asia-Pacific
- Website: www.yotel.com

Yotel is a hotel chain based in the United Kingdom. The company's main shareholders include the Al-Bahar Group, United Investment Portugal, and Kuwait Real Estate Company (AQARAT). The company operates under three different brands: YOTEL, YOTELAIR and YOTELPAD.

== History ==
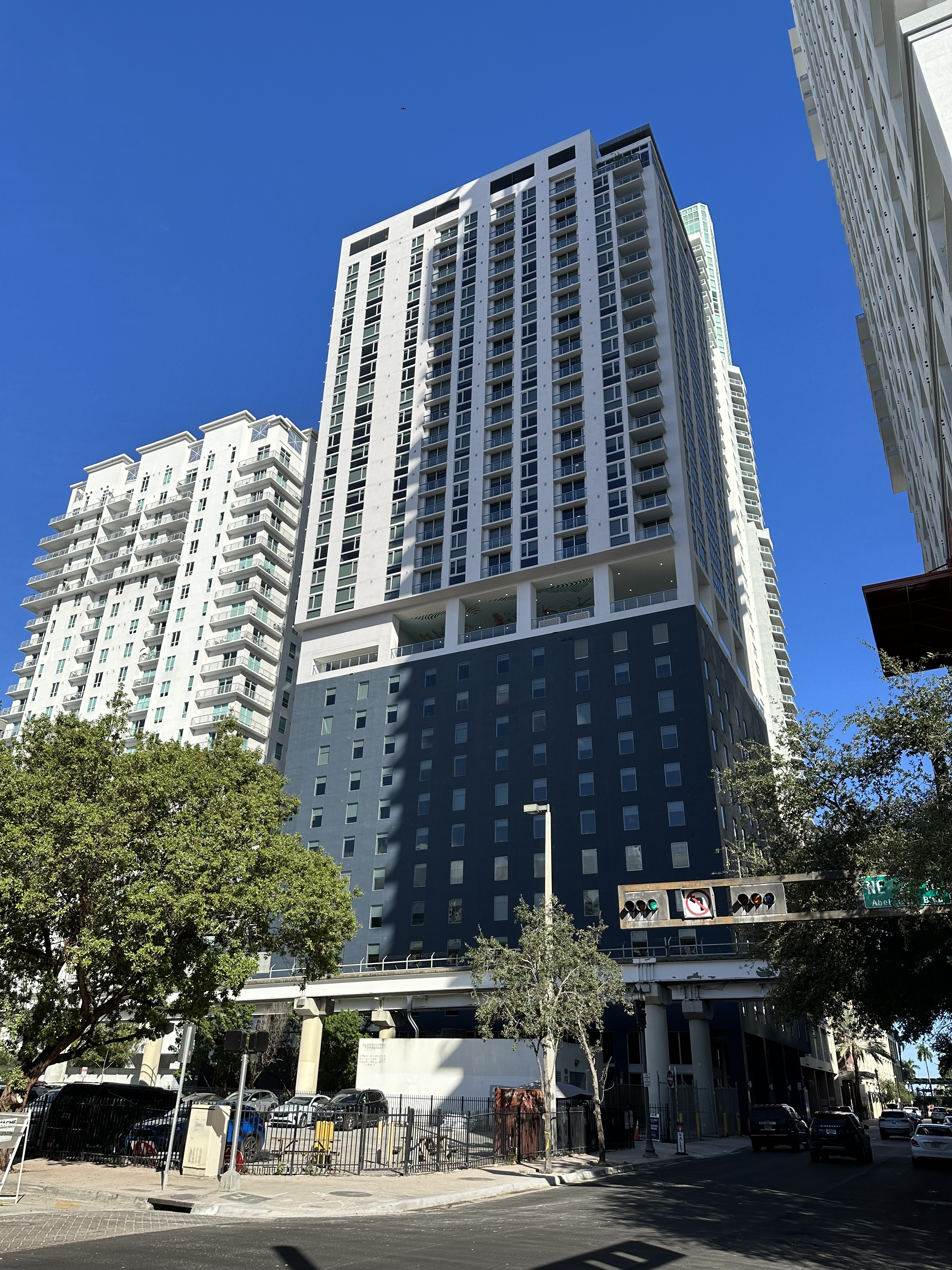
Yotel in Downtown Miami

The first YOTEL was opened in 2007 at Gatwick Airport, closely followed by one at Heathrow Airport. The chain was the second venture of Simon Woodroffe and the YO! Company after YO! Sushi. In 2009, YOTEL opened a branch at Amsterdam Schiphol Airport and the company won the Business Accommodation of the Year award at the Business Travel World Awards.

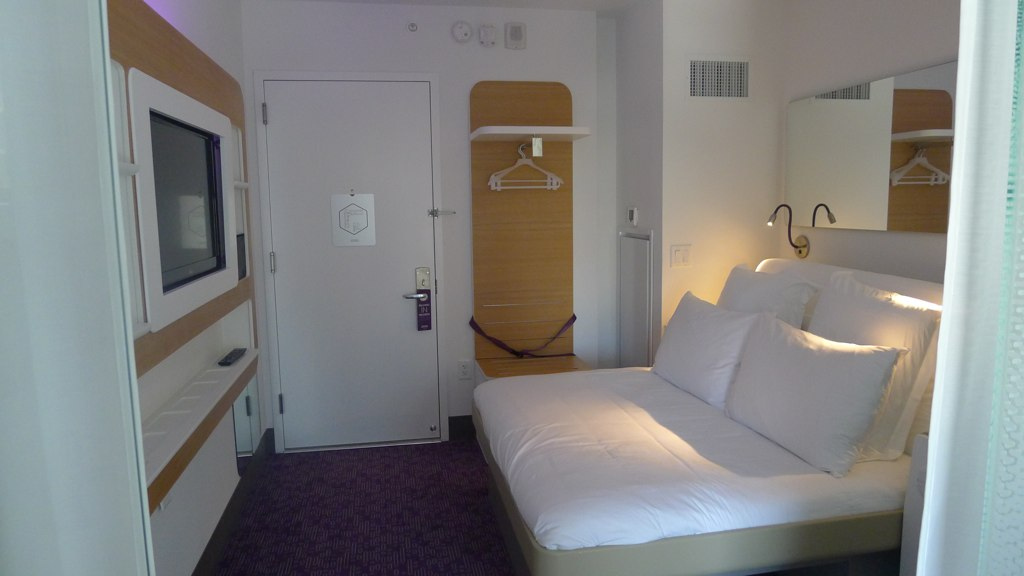
Room within a Yotel in New York City

On 13 June 2011, YOTEL opened a hotel in New York City at 570 10th Ave, as a part of the $300 Million MiMA complex which includes residential units. Rockwell Group and Softroom designed the 669 rooms sized at 16 square metres (170 ft^{2}) each. YOTEL New York has a multi-bar 4,000 square feet (370 m^{2}) balcony, Terrace.

In 2015, YOTEL announced plans to expand to Boston, Dubai, Singapore (Orchard Road and Changi Airport), Paris (Charles De Gaulle), Miami, London and San Francisco. In 2017, YOTEL opened its city centre hotels in Boston and Singapore and begun construction in London. It also announced a further location in Amsterdam city centre. Later in the year, YOTEL formed a $250 million strategic partnership with Starwood Capital Group for a 30 percent stake in the company and the first city YOTEL investment in Edinburgh was confirmed.

In 2018, YOTEL launched its new brand: YOTELPAD. YOTELPAD is an extended-stay business, where guests can stay from one day up to a year. YOTEL confirmed 6 new PAD developments in Park City, Dubai, Miami and Geneva.

Furthermore, the company announced properties in Glasgow and Istanbul New Airport.

In 2018, YOTEL also forged a partnership with Plug and Play – a Silicon Valley innovation platform for start-ups, corporations and investors.

In 2019 and 2020, YOTEL opened its first hotels in London, Edinburgh, Istanbul, San Francisco, Washington DC, Park City with plans to open Porto, Glasgow and Miami in 2021. YOTEL plans to double its portfolio to 15,000 globally by 2030.

In July 2022, YOTEL announced plans to open its first hotel in Japan, a 244-room property in one of Tokyo's main shopping districts, Ginza. In March 2023, YOTEL announced it would open its first YOTELPAD location outside of the U.S. in London, England. YOTELPAD London Stratford was opened in 2023 and will be the company's seventh overall property in the U.K. and third in London joining locations in London City and London Gatwick.

In 2026, Hilton Worldwide announced an exclusive agreement with YOTEL to intergrate the brand into the new Select by Hilton.

The company now operates fifteen city centre hotels in New York, Boston, San Francisco, Washington DC, Miami, Park City, Singapore, Tokyo, Edinburgh, London (2), Amsterdam, Porto, Glasgow and Manchester, and six airport hotels in London Gatwick, Amsterdam Schiphol, Paris, Charles de Gaulle, Istanbul Airport (2), and Singapore Changi.

== Description ==
The YOTEL concept came about when the founder was on a first-class flight. The team enlisted the help of aircraft cabin designers Priestman Goode to design and build a prototype room known as a 'cabin'. The original prototype cabin was displayed at an exhibition called 100% Design in London.

Hotels have self-check-in kiosks, convertible double beds, adjustable mood lighting and systems. Furthermore, the New York hotel is home to the YOBOT, the world's first robotic luggage concierge. The hotels in Boston, Singapore and Tokyo have delivery robots which take amenities to the rooms. These robots are programmed to negotiate lifts and corridors and they can interact with people.
