= Simon Woodroffe =

British businessman (born 1952)

Simon Woodroffe OBE
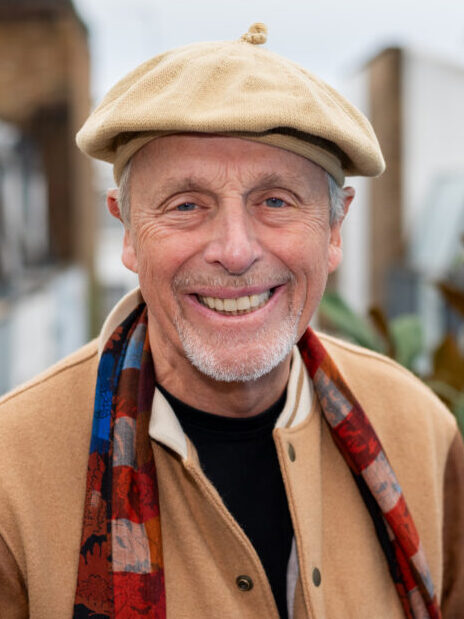
- Simon Woodroffe in 2023
- Born: 14 February 1952 (age 74); Oxford, Oxfordshire, England
- Education: Marlborough College
- Occupations: Entrepreneur, motivational speaker
- Known for: YO! Sushi; Yotel; Dragons' Den
- Family: Patrick Woodroffe (brother)

Simon Woodroffe (born 14 February 1952) is a British entrepreneur and business speaker, known as the founder of YO! Sushi and Yotel. He appeared as an investor on the first series of BBC's Dragons' Den, before being replaced by Theo Paphitis from the second series onwards.

Woodroffe's first YO! Sushi restaurant, opened in 1997, introduced conveyor belt sushi to the UK market and included technology such as automated drink delivery systems, tableside call buttons, and self-heating plates.

Woodroffe was appointed an Officer of the Order of the British Empire (OBE) in 2006 for his contributions to the hospitality industry.

== Early life and education ==
Woodroffe was born in Oxford to a military family; his father served as a brigadier in the British Army. He grew up with his younger brother Patrick (born 1954) in Essex, where the family resided in a farmhouse. Woodroffe attended Marlborough College but left at age 16 with only two O-levels.

== Career ==
After leaving school, Woodroffe started his career as a theatre stagehand. In the 1960s, he became a road crew and stage designer for artists such as Rod Stewart, the Moody Blues and Jethro Tull. Woodroffe subsequently spent several years in the television industry, initially selling rights to rock and pop concerts and later producing programs on extreme sports.

Woodroffe appeared on the pilot episode of Crisis Command, during which his decisions caused the theoretical destruction of the Houses of Parliament and flooding of the London Underground.

=== YO! Sushi ===
Woodroffe founded YO! Sushi in 1997, financing it through extended supplier payment terms rather than traditional start-up capital. Initially perceived as supported by major brands such as Honda and Sony, their contributions were later clarified as minimal sponsorship.

In 2003, Woodroffe sold a controlling stake in YO! Sushi for £10 million to Primary Capital, while retaining a 22% share. He later divested his remaining shares but maintained a 1% perpetual royalty agreement on gross sales. In 2023, the brand was sold to Zensho Holdings for £494 million.

=== Yotel and YO! Company ===
Woodroffe established the Yotel brand in 2007, introducing compact hotel rooms modeled after first-class airline cabins. The chain began operations at London's Gatwick and Heathrow airports before expanding internationally. By 2016, Yotel operated over 1,000 rooms across three countries.

Through YO! Company, Woodroffe later diversified into property development with YO! Home. He also established YO! Foundation for his charitable activities.

== Prison reform advocacy ==
Woodroffe has supported prison reform by promoting vocational training and entrepreneurship programmes for inmates. He has collaborated with organizations such as Make Justice Work, which is focused on reducing reoffending rates and has publicly advocated policies giving priority to rehabilitation and skill-building within the prison system.

== Awards ==
- Ernst & Young Entrepreneur of the Year, 1999.
- Officer of the Order of the British Empire (OBE), 2006.
