= Stranger Than You =

Single by Joe Jackson

from the album Night and Day II
- B-side: "Hell of a Town"
- Released: 2000
- Length: 3:47 (single version); 4:19 (album version)
- Label: Sony Classical
- Songwriter: Joe Jackson
- Producer: Joe Jackson

Joe Jackson singles chronology
"Statue of Liberty" (1997)	"Stranger Than You" (2000)	"Glamour and Pain" (2002)

"Stranger Than You" is a song by British singer-songwriter and musician Joe Jackson, released in 2000 as the lead single from his studio album Night and Day II (2000). The song was written and produced by Jackson. It reached No. 91 on the Dutch Single Top 100 chart.

In a 2007 interview with FaceCulture, Jackson revealed his inspiration for the song: "It was one of the things that attracted me to New York; no matter how weird you think you are, there's always someone stranger than you."

== Critical reception ==
In a review of the single, FMQB wrote, "Joe Jackson's is a talent that encompasses styles and genres that just won't work on most mainstream radio stations. That's where we come in. Own this." In a review of Night and Day II, Bernard Zuel of The Sydney Morning Herald felt "Stranger Than You" was reminiscent of Billy Joel and described it as a "fine pop song, though too stylish for mainstream radio". L.A. Tarone of the Standard-Speaker considered it to use a "Chopin-ish piano as its foundation" and noted the "gorgeous chamber string explosion mid-tune". Lyrically, he added, "Jackson finds romance amidst the seemliness and is happy".

Steve Darnall of the Chicago Tribune commented, "The sardonic overture 'Hell of a Town' and the Brill Building-influenced "Stranger Than You" prove that intimacy and humor are still Jackson's greatest assets." Trouser Press noted the "humorous" aspect of the song's lyrics which "salut[es] the oddest characters Jackson's found in his adopted hometown". Dw. Dunphy of Popdose picked the song as number two on a top ten list of Jackson's songs. Dunphy felt that Night and Day II was "probably an ill-advised project" where "several of the songs simply don't hang together", but added "Stranger Than You" was an exception.

== Track listing ==
CD single

1. "Stranger Than You" - 4:19
2. "Hell of a Town" - 3:19

CD single (European promo)

1. "Stranger Than You" (Special Radio Edit) - 3:17
2. "Hell of a Town" - 3:19

CD single (Canadian promo)

1. "Stranger Than You" (Radio Edit) - 3:47
2. "Stranger Than You" (Album Version) - 4:19

CD single (French promo)

1. "Stranger Than You" (Radio Edit) - 3:47
2. "Love Got Lost" - 4:24

== Personnel ==
Production

- Joe Jackson - producer, arranger
- Dan Gellert - engineer, associate producer
- Charlie Post, Ross Peterson - additional engineering
- Ted Jensen - mastering

Other

- Alex Vandoros - photography
- Joe Jackson - art direction

== Charts ==
Chart (2000–01)	Peak position
Netherlands (Single Top 100)	91
US Adult Alternative Airplay (Billboard)	30
US Adult Alternative Top 30 (Radio & Records)	20
