= YO! Sushi =

British franchised kiosk and restaurant chain

YO! Sushi Limited
- Type: Private
- Industry: Kiosks; Restaurants
- Founded: 14 May 1997; 29 years ago
- Founder: Simon Woodroffe
- Headquarters: Soho, London, United Kingdom
- Number of locations: 50 restaurants
- Area served: United Kingdom, United Arab Emirates, Saudi Arabia, Bahrain, Kuwait and Australia.
- Key people: Richard Hodgson (CEO)
- Products: Sushi
- Revenue: £80 million (2015)
- Owner: Zensho
- Number of employees: 1,800 (2015)
- Parent: The Wonderfield Group
- Website: yosushi.com

YO! Sushi Limited (sometimes shortened to just YO!) is a chain of kiosks and conveyor belt sushi restaurants, principally in the United Kingdom, United Arab Emirates, Saudi Arabia, Bahrain, Kuwait and Australia.

== History ==
Previous logo

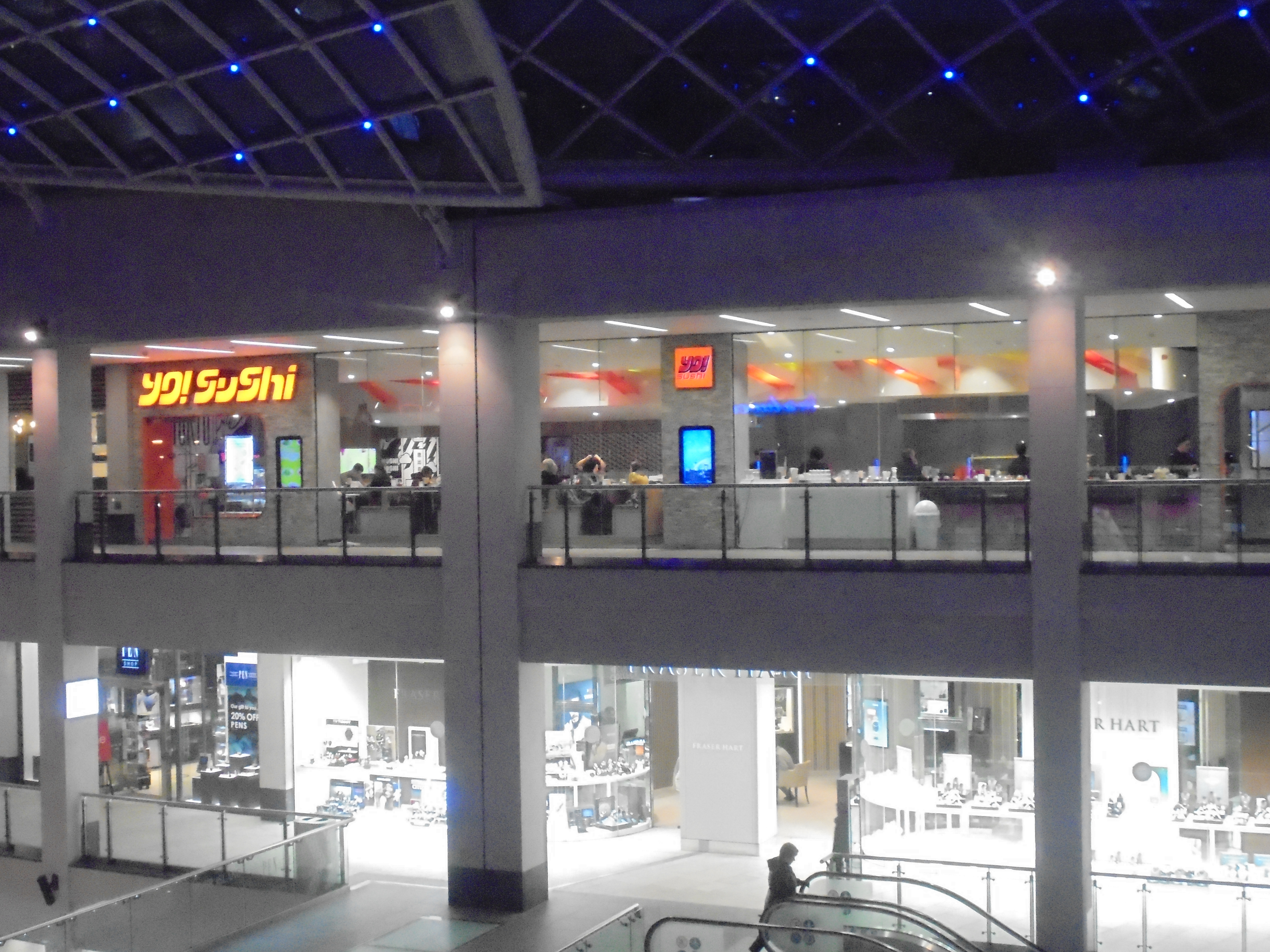
YO! Sushi at Trinity Leeds. (2019)

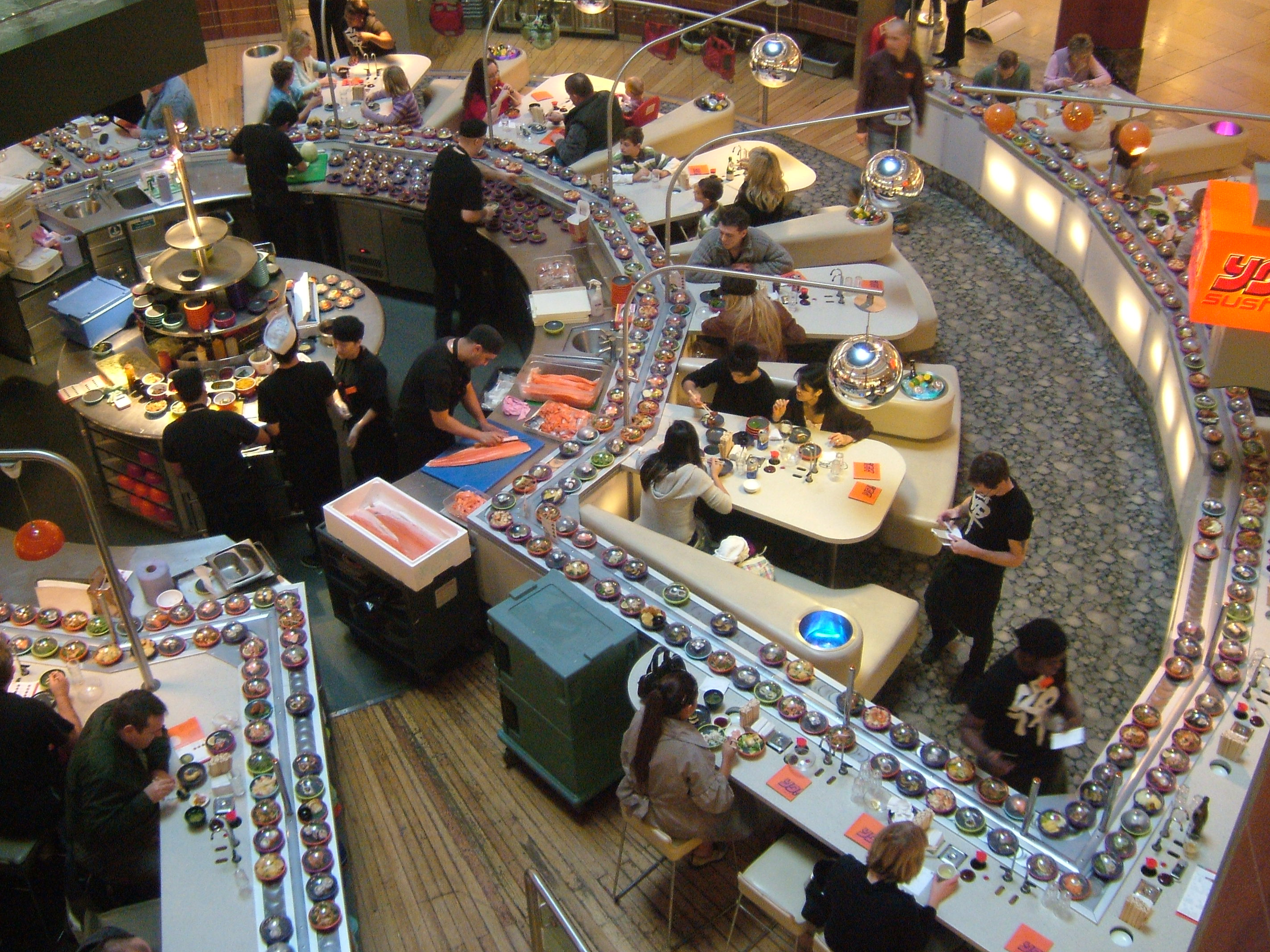
YO! Sushi in Bluewater Shopping Centre (2007)

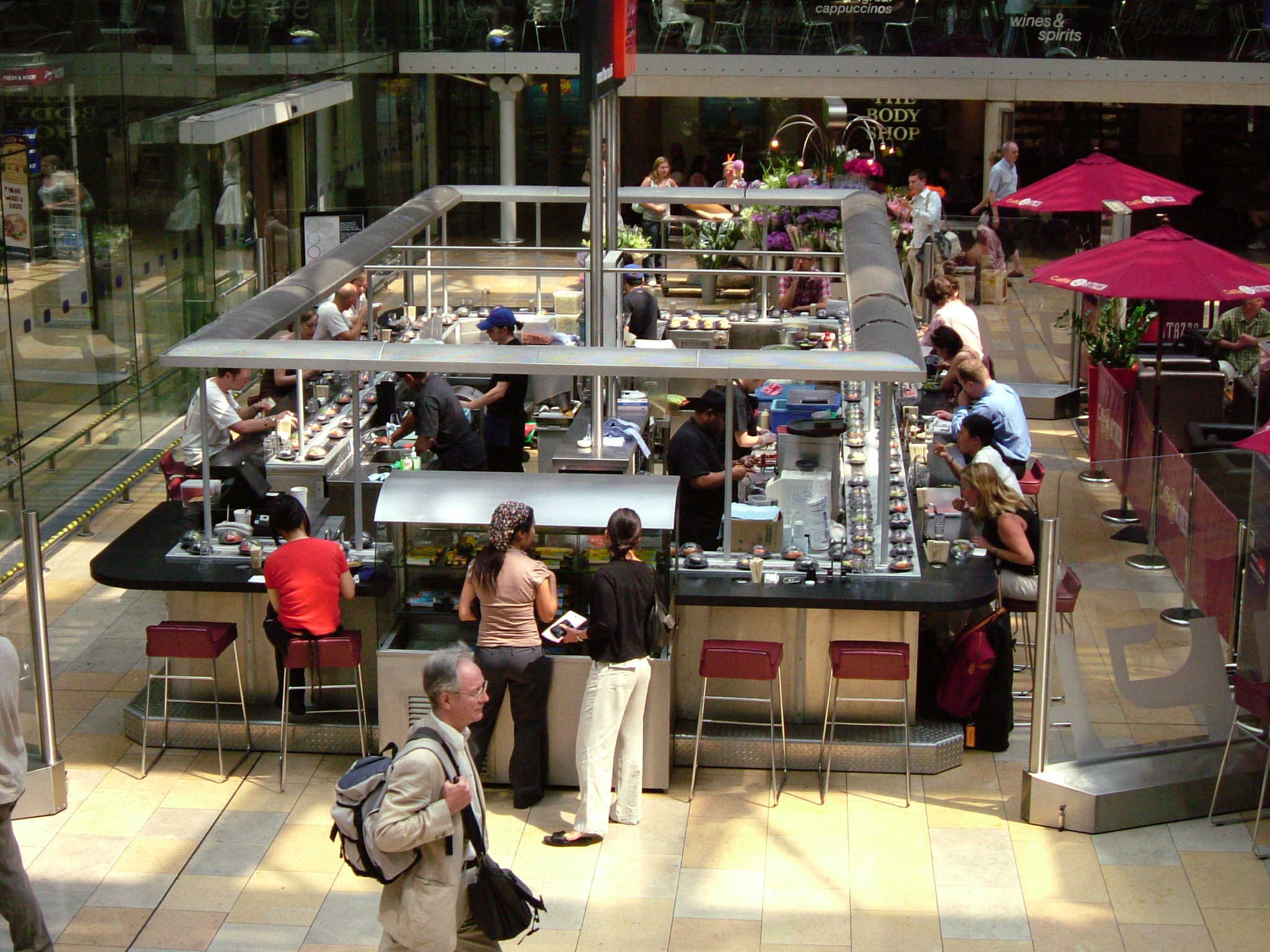
YO! Sushi in Paddington station, London (2005)

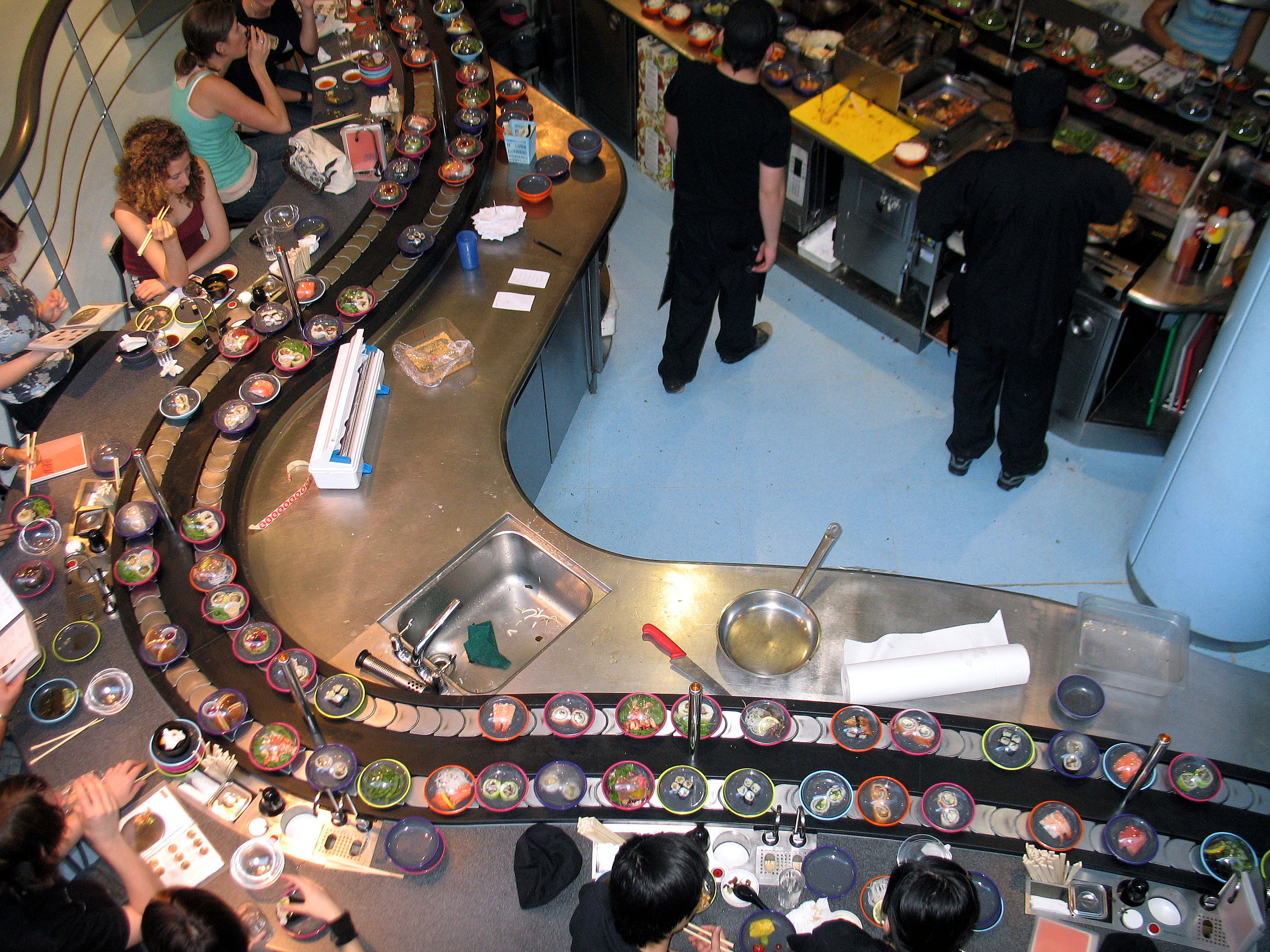
YO! Sushi in Manchester (2006)

YO! Sushi was founded in 1997, by British entrepreneur Simon Woodroffe. The current owner is Zensho Holdings, with royalties paid to YO! Company. YO! Sushi opened its first restaurant in Soho, London in January 1997. A second restaurant followed opening in Harvey Nichols.

In 2000, Robin Rowland became CEO, and in 2002, YO! Sushi opened their first restaurant outside London, in Manchester's Selfridges. By 2003, the company had twelve restaurants open, and the first franchise opened in Dubai, United Arab Emirates.

In April 2003, one scene from the movie Johnny English takes place in a restaurant of YO! Sushi. Johnny English gets his tie stuck in the conveyor belt. Two new franchises opened in 2007, one in Dublin, the other in Moscow. In April 2010, they opened their fiftieth company owned restaurant in Market Place, London.

In 2008, they became the first catering group to adopt the Food Standards Agency's traffic light colour coding system, which allows customers to see nutritional information about the food they are eating.

From 1 September 2009, the YO! Sushi in Whiteleys Shopping Centre launched its takeaway and delivery services, allowing customers to go into the restaurant and order their food or order online to get food delivered to their homes.

By June 2014, the company had more than seventy restaurants. In October 2016, the company opened its first American stand alone restaurant in Boston, Massachusetts, and a few months later, in the Flatiron District in Manhattan, in March 2017. The company had five restaurants in North America, but all of them have since closed.

On 31 July 2024, YO! Sushi's parent company Snowfox rebranded to The Wonderfield Group; YO! Sushi and other businesses in their portfolio would be phased out for the Wonderfield branding.

== Restaurants ==
YO! Sushi specialises in delivering sushi to customers using the Japanese style 'kaiten' conveyor belt method. In each restaurant various sushi dishes and other Japanese cooked foods are prepared in a theater style kitchen in plain view of customers and then set on the thin conveyor belt.

The belt carries food around the restaurant in a circuit, allowing diners to pick any dish from the belt.

The restaurants are mostly based in the United Kingdom with the majority in London. Restaurants have also been opened in the Middle East in Dubai, Saudi Arabia, Bahrain and Kuwait, with others in other countries such as Ireland.

In the United States, YO! Sushi has opened five restaurants: There was a YO! Sushi located at the Westfield Garden State Plaza shopping mall in Paramus, New Jersey, which is close to New York City. The location opened in May 2015, but it closed in 2017. There was also another location in Sarasota, Florida.

Then, three more locations opened in Tampa, Florida, Short Hills, New Jersey at The Mall at Short Hills, and Woodbury Commons mall in Central Valley, New York. All of the locations in the United States were eventually closed by 2018. Mayfair Equity Partners acquired Canadas Bento Sushi in 2018.

The company's headquarters is on Farringdon Road, London, United Kingdom. The company offer a menu with 19 vegan items. At the PETA Vegan Food Awards 2015, the company's Tofu Katsu Curry won in the category Best Vegan Curry. The restaurant also provides classes in making sushi.

In August 2020, YO! Sushi announced that it will shut 19 of its restaurants and cut up to 250 jobs as part of a Company Voluntary Arrangement (CVA) restructuring process.

== Environmental record ==
In November 2015, the Marine Conservation Society rated restaurants on the sustainability of their seafood. YO! Sushi served more species of seafood than the other chains surveyed, and still received a rating of 4.1 out of 5.0 which was among the highest ratings.

== See also ==
- List of sushi restaurants
