= 1947 in music =

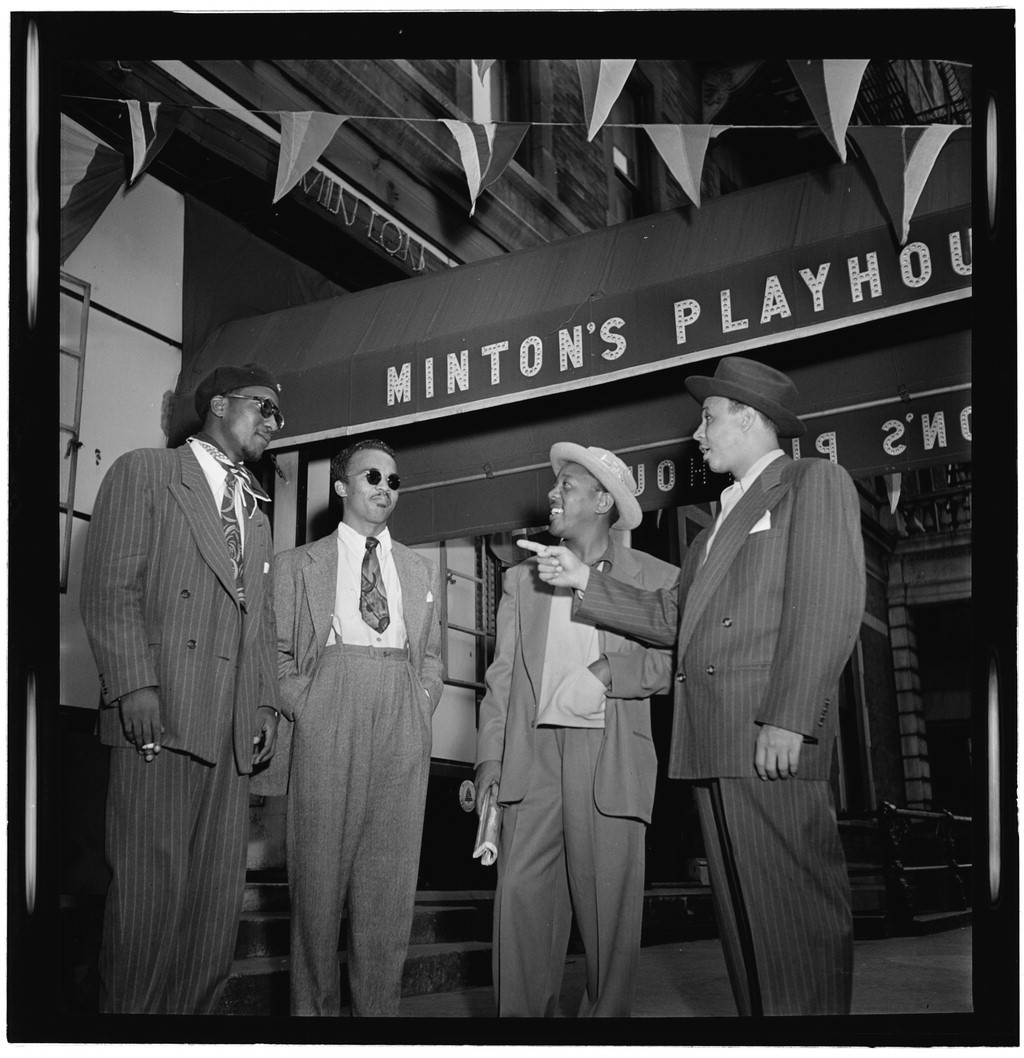
Musicians including Thelonious Monk and Roy Eldridge in New York City in 1947

This is a list of notable events in music that took place in the year 1947.

== Specific locations ==
- 1947 in British music
- 1947 in Norwegian music

== Specific genres ==
- 1947 in country music
- 1947 in jazz

== Events ==
- June 11 – 15 – First Llangollen International Musical Eisteddfod is held in Wales.
- August 7 – Carlo Bergonzi makes his professional debut as Schaunard in La bohème at the Arena Argentina in Catania.
- October – Enrico De Angelis leaves Quartetto Cetra to join the army. Lucia Mannucci replaces him.
- Jack Brymer becomes principal clarinettist of the Royal Philharmonic Orchestra.
- Patti Page signs with Mercury.
- Frankie Laine earns the first of his 21 gold records.
- Kay Starr signs with Capitol.
- George Jones begins performing.
- Ernesto Bonino embarks on his Latin American tour.
- The Amadeus Quartet is founded, as the Brainin Quartet.
- Bernard Greenhouse and John Serry Sr. appear in Studio One on the CBS network.

== Albums released ==
- Glenn Miller Masterpieces, Vol. 2 – Glenn Miller
- Music Out of the Moon – Les Baxter
- The Jolson Album Vol. 1 – Al Jolson
- St. Patrick's Day – Bing Crosby
- Accordion Capers – The Biviano Rhythm Sexteete with John Serry Sr. & Tony Mottola

== Top popular records of 1947 ==
Before the Hot100 was implemented in 1958, Billboard magazine measured a record's performance in the United States with three charts, 'Best-Selling Popular Retail Records', 'Records Most-Played On the Air' or 'Records Most Played By Disk Jockeys' and 'Most-Played Juke Box Records'. The following rankings are supplemented with reliable data from the "Discography of American Historical Recordings" website, Joel Whitburn's Pop Memories 1890-1954 and other sources as specified.

Rank	Artist	Title	Label	Recorded	Released	Chart positions
1	Francis Craig and His Orchestra	"Near You"	Bullet 1001	February 1947	March 1947	US Billboard 1947 no. 1, US no. 1 for 17 weeks, 25 total weeks, 657 points, sold 2.5 million
2	Ted Weems and His Orchestra	"Heartaches"	Decca 25017	August 23, 1938	December 1946	US Billboard 1947 no. 2, US no. 1 for 13 weeks, 20 total weeks, 643 points
3	Vaughn Monroe and His Orchestra	"Ballerina"	RCA Victor 20-2433	August 12, 1947	October 1947	US Billboard 1947 no. 3, US no. 1 for 10 weeks, 22 total weeks, 589 points
4	The Harmonicats	"Peg o' My Heart"	Vitacoustic 1	March 1947	April 1947	US Billboard 1947 no. 4, US no. 1 for 8 weeks, 26 total weeks, 452 points
5	Buddy Clark (Ray Noble Orchestra)	"Linda"	Columbia 37215	November 15, 1946	February 1947	US Billboard 1947 no. 5, US no. 1 for 2 weeks, 23 total weeks, 381 points, CashBox no. 4
6	Tex Williams and The Western Caravan	"Smoke! Smoke! Smoke! (That Cigarette)"	Capitol 40001	March 27, 1947	May 10, 1947	US Billboard 1947 no. 6, US no. 1 for 6 weeks, 23 total weeks, US Hillbilly 1947 no. 3, USHB no. 1 for 16 weeks, 23 total weeks, 358 points
7	The Three Suns	"Peg O' My Heart"	RCA Victor 20-2272	April 25, 1947	May 15, 1947	US Billboard 1947 no. 7, US no. 1 for 4 weeks, 19 total weeks, 326 points
8	Arthur Godfrey	"Too Fat Polka (I Don't Want Her-You Can Have Her-She's Too Fat For Me)"	Columbia 37921	August 1947	September 29, 1947	US Billboard 1947 no. 8, US no. 2 for 8 weeks, 18 total weeks, 320 points
9	Perry Como (Ted Weems Orchestra)	"I Wonder Who's Kissing Her Now"	Decca 25078	October 5, 1939	June 1947	US Billboard 1947 no. 9, US no. 1 for 1 weeks, 17 total weeks, 283 points
10	Freddy Martin and His Orchestra	"Managua, Nicaragua"	RCA Victor 20-2026	1946	November 1946	US Billboard 1947 no. 10, US no. 1 for 3 weeks, 13 total weeks, 239 points, CashBox no. 4
11	Eddy Howard and His Orchestra	"I Wonder, I Wonder, I Wonder"	Majestic 1124	April 1947	May 1947	US Billboard 1947 no. 11, US no. 2 for 4 weeks, 19 total weeks, 237 points, CashBox no. 4
12	Hoagy Carmichael	"Huggin' and Chalkin'"	Decca 23675	August 19, 1946	October 1946	US Billboard 1947 no. 12, US no. 1 for 2 weeks, 15 total weeks, 218 points, CashBox no. 3, Grammy Hall of Fame in 1998, 1,000,000 sales
13	Art Lund	"Mam'selle"	MGM 10011	February 20, 1947	April 1947	US Billboard 1947 no. 13, US no. 1 for 2 weeks, 13 total weeks, 216 points
14	Vaughn Monroe and His Orchestra	"I Wish I Didn't Love You So"	RCA Victor 20-2294	November 8, 1946	May 1947	US Billboard 1947 no. 14, US no. 2 for 5 weeks, 15 total weeks, 202 points
15	Jack Owens	"How Soon (Will I Be Seeing You)"	Tower 1258	1947	October 1947	US Billboard 1947 no. 15, US no. 2 for 1 weeks, 20 total weeks, 201 points
16	Eddy Howard and His Orchestra	"My Adobe Hacienda"	Majestic 1117	January 1947	April 1947	US Billboard 1947 no. 16, US no. 2 for 5 weeks, 15 total weeks, 193 points, CashBox no. 4
17	Sammy Kaye and His Orchestra (Vocal Don Cornell)	"That's My Desire"	RCA Victor 20-2251	April 1947	May 1947	US Billboard 1947 no. 17, US no. 2 for 1 weeks, 22 total weeks, 193 points
18	Red Ingle and The Natural Seven vocal by Cinderella G Stump	"Temptation (Tim-Tayshun)"	Capitol 412	March 14, 1947	May 1947	US Billboard 1947 no. 18, US no. 1 for 1 week, 15 total weeks, US Hillbilly 1947 no. 7, USHB no. 2 for 11 weeks, 18 total weeks, 190 points
19	Perry Como	"When You Were Sweet Sixteen"	RCA Victor 20-2259	April 10, 1947	May 1947	US Billboard 1947 no. 19, US no. 2 for 1 weeks, 19 total weeks, 183 points
20	Buddy Clark (Mitchell Ayres Orchestra)	"Peg O' My Heart"	Columbia 37392	April 25, 1947	July 5, 1947	US Billboard 1947 no. 20, US no. 1 for 6 weeks, 15 total weeks, 165 points
21	Perry Como	"Chi-Baba, Chi-Baba (My Bambino Go to Sleep)"	RCA Victor 20-2259	April 10, 1947	May 1947	US Billboard 1947 no. 21, US no. 1 for 3 weeks, 13 total weeks, 160 points
22	Dinah Shore	"Anniversary Song"	Columbia 37234	February 12, 1947	March 25, 1947	US Billboard 1947 no. 22, US no. 1 for 2 weeks, 12 total weeks, 158 points

=== Billboard Most-Played Juke Box Race Records ===
The following songs appeared in The Billboard's Most-Played Juke Box Race Records chart, starting November 1946 through November 1947. Each week ten points were awarded to the number one record, then four points for number two, three points for number three, and so on. This system rewards songs that reach the highest positions, as well as those that had the longest chart runs. Also see Billboard Most-Played Race Records of 1947.

Rank	Artist	Title	Label	Recorded	Released	Chart positions
1	Louis Jordan and His Tympany Five	"Ain't Nobody Here but Us Chickens"	Decca 23741	June 26, 1946	November 1946	US Billboard 1947 no. 88, US pop charts no. 6 for 1 week, 6 total weeks, US Billboard Most-Played Juke Box Race Records 1947 no. 1, Race Records chart no. 1 for 17 weeks, 27 total weeks, 199 points
2	Louis Jordan and His Tympany Five	"Boogie Woogie Blue Plate"	Decca 24104	April 23, 1947	August 1947	US Billboard 1947 no. 205, US pop charts no. 21 for 1 week, 1 total weeks, US Billboard Most-Played Juke Box Race Records 1947 no. 2, Race Records chart no. 1 for 14 weeks, 25 total weeks, 168 points
3	Julia Lee and Her Boy Friends	"(Opportunity Knocks But Once) Snatch and Grab It"	Capitol Americano 40028	June 11, 1947	September 1947	US Billboard 1947 no. 287, US pop charts no. 24 for 1 week, 1 total weeks, US Billboard Most-Played Juke Box Race Records 1947 no. 3, Race Records chart no. 1 for 12 weeks, 28 total weeks, 168 pointsselling over 500,000 copies
4	Savannah Churchill and the Sentimentalists (aka The Four Tunes)	"I Want to Be Loved (But Only by You)"	Manor 1046	November 1946	December 1946	US Billboard 1947 no. 236, US pop charts no. 21 for 1 week, 1 total weeks, US Billboard Most-Played Juke Box Race Records 1947 no. 4, Race Records chart no. 1 for 8 weeks, 25 total weeks, 127 points
5	Louis Jordan and His Tympany Five	"Jack, You're Dead"	Decca 23901	October 10, 1946	May 1947	US Billboard 1947 no. 200, US pop charts no. 21 for 1 week, 1 total weeks, US Billboard Most-Played Juke Box Race Records 1947 no. 5, US no. 1 for 7 weeks, 20 total weeks, 108 points
6	Eddie Vinson and His Orchestra	"Old Maid Boogie"	Mercury 8028	November 15, 1946	February 1947	US Billboard Most-Played Juke Box Race Records 1947 no. 6, US no. 1 for 2 weeks, 23 total weeks, 79 points
7	Nellie Lutcher and Her Rhythm	"He's a Real Gone Guy"	Capitol Americano 40017	April 30, 1947	September 1947	US Billboard 1947 no. 160, US pop charts no. 15 for 1 week, 1 total weeks, US Billboard Most-Played Juke Box Race Records 1947 no. 7, Race Records chart no. 2 for 3 weeks, 23 total weeks, 53 points
8	Louis Jordan and His Tympany Five	"Let The Good Times Roll"	Decca 23741	June 26, 1946	November 1946	US Billboard 1947 no. 88, US pop charts no. 6 for 1 week, 12 total weeks, US Billboard Most-Played Juke Box Race Records 1947 no. 8, US no. 2 for 4 weeks, 23 total weeks, 52 points
9	Louis Jordan and His Tympany Five	"Texas and Pacific"	Decca 23810	October 10, 1946	December 1946	US Billboard 1947 no. 197, US pop charts no. 20 for 1 week, 3 total weeks, US Billboard Most-Played Juke Box Race Records 1947 no. 9, US no. 1 for 2 weeks, 15 total weeks, 49 points
10	Nellie Lutcher and Her Rhythm	"Hurry on Down"	Capitol Americano 40002	April 10, 1947	July 1947	US Billboard 1947 no. 196, US pop charts no. 20 for 1 week, 5 total weeks, US Billboard Most-Played Juke Box Race Records 1947 no. 10, Race Records chart no. 2 for 3 weeks, 18 total weeks, 39 points
11	Johnny Moore's Three Blazers (vocal Charles Brown)	"New Orleans Blues"	Exclusive 240	1947	May 1947	US Billboard Most-Played Juke Box Race Records 1947 no. 11, US no. 2 for 2 weeks, 13 total weeks, 32 points
12	Lionel Hampton and His Hamptonians	"I Want to Be Loved (But Only by You)"	Decca 23879	April 2, 1947	April 1947	US Billboard Most-Played Juke Box Race Records 1947 no. 12, US no. 2 for 1 weeks, 11 total weeks, 25 points
13	Mills Brothers	"Across the Alley from the Alamo"	Decca 23863	March 3, 1947	May 1947	US Billboard 1947 no. 30, US pop charts no. 2 for 2 weeks, 15 total weeks, US Billboard Most-Played Juke Box Race Records 1947 no. 13, Race Records chart no. 2 for 1 week, 12 total weeks, 24 points
14	Louis Jordan and His Tympany Five	"Open the Door, Richard!"	Decca 23841	January 23, 1947	March 25, 1947	US Billboard 1947 no. 66, US pop charts no. 6 for 1 week, 4 total weeks, US Billboard Most-Played Juke Box Race Records 1947 no. 14, Race Records chart no. 2 for 4 weeks, 6 total weeks, 21 points
15	Frankie Laine and Mannie Klein's All Stars	"That's My Desire"	Mercury 5007	August 27, 1946	December 12, 1946	US Billboard 1947 no. 44, US pop charts no. 4 for 1 week, 26 total weeks, US Billboard Most-Played Juke Box Race Records 1947 no. 15, Race Records chart no. 3 for 2 weeks, 11 total weeks, 20 points
16	Jack McVea and His All-Stars	"Open The Door, Richard!"	Black & White 792	September 15, 1946	January 1947	US Billboard 1947 no. 64, US pop charts no. 3 for 1 week, 9 total weeks, US Billboard Most-Played Juke Box Race Records 1947 no. 16, Race Records chart no. 2 for 2 weeks, 7 total weeks, 19 points
17	Dusty Fletcher	"Open The Door, Richard (Part 1)"	National 4012	January 4, 1947	January 1947	US Billboard 1947 no. 50, US pop charts no. 3 for 1 week, 7 total weeks, US Billboard Most-Played Juke Box Race Records 1947 no. 17, Race Records chart no. 2 for 2 weeks, 7 total weeks, 19 points
18	Louis Jordan and His Tympany Five	"Early In The Mornin''"	Decca 24155	April 23, 1947	October 1947	US Billboard Most-Played Juke Box Race Records 1947 no. 18, Race Records chart no. 3 for 3 weeks, 10 total weeks, 19 points
19	Erskine Hawkins	"Hawk's Boogie"	RCA Victor 20-2169	October 7, 1946	March 1947	US Billboard Most-Played Juke Box Race Records 1947 no. 19, Race Records chart no. 2 for 1 week, 8 total weeks, 18 points
20	Annie Laurie with Paul Gayten Trio	"Since I Fell for You"	DeLuxe 1082	April 23, 1947	July 1947	US Billboard 1947 no. 198, US pop charts no. 20 for 1 week, 1 total weeks, US Billboard Most-Played Juke Box Race Records 1947 no. 20, Race Records chart no. 3 for 3 weeks, 10 total weeks, 18 points
21	Count Basie and His Orchestra	"Open The Door, Richard!"	RCA Victor 20-2127	January 3, 1947	January 1947	US Billboard 1947 no. 29, US pop charts no. 1 for 1 week, 9 total weeks, US Billboard Most-Played Juke Box Race Records 1947 no. 21, Race Records chart no. 2 for 1 weeks, 6 total weeks, 15 points

== Published popular music ==
- "Afraid to Fall in Love" w. Ralph Blane m. Harry Warren. Introduced by Mickey Rooney and Gloria DeHaven in the 1948 film Summer Holiday
- "Almost Like Being in Love" w. Alan Jay Lerner m. Frederick Loewe. Introduced by David Brooks and Marion Bell in the musical Brigadoon. Performed in the 1954 film version by Gene Kelly.
- "An Apple Blossom Wedding" w.m. Jimmy Kennedy and Nat Simon
- "And Mimi" w.m. Jimmy Kennedy and Nat Simon
- "Apalachicola F.L.A." w. Johnny Burke m. Jimmy Van Heusen. Introduced by Bob Hope and Bing Crosby in the film Road to Rio
- "An Apple Blossom Wedding" w.m. Jimmy Kennedy and Nat Simon
- "April in Portugal" w. Jose Galhardo (Port) Jimmy Kennedy (Eng) m. Raul Ferrão
- "Autumn Leaves" ("Les Feuilles Mortes") w.(Eng) Johnny Mercer (Fr) Jacques Prévert m. Joseph Kosma
- "Ballerina" w.m. Bob Russell and Carl Sigman
- "Big Brass Band from Brazil" w.m. Bob Hilliard and Carl Sigman
- "Bloop Bleep" w.m. Frank Loesser
- "Bouquet of Roses" w.m. Steve Nelson and Bob Hilliard
- "Busy Doing Nothing" w. Johnny Burke m. Jimmy Van Heusen
- "But Beautiful" w. Johnny Burke m. Jimmy Van Heusen
- "Buttons and Bows" w.m. Jay Livingston and Ray Evans
- "C'est si bon" w.(Eng) Jerry Seelen (Fr) André Hornez m. Henri Betti
- "Chi-Baba, Chi-Baba" w.m. Mack David, Jerry Livingston and Al Hoffman
- "Cigarettes, Whisky, And Wild, Wild Women" w.m. Tim Spencer
- "Civilization" w.m. Bob Hilliard and Carl Sigman. Introduced by Elaine Stritch in the revue Angel in the Wings
- "Clancy Lowered the Boom" w.m. Hy Heath and Johnny Lange
- "Come to Me, Bend to Me" w. Alan Jay Lerner m. Frederick Loewe
- "Come to the Mardi Gras" w. (Eng) Ervin Drake and Jimmy Shirl (Port) Max Bulhoes and Milton De Oliviera m. Max Bulhoes and Milton De Oliviera
- "Confess" w.m. Bennie Benjamin and George David Weiss
- "Cuanto Le Gusta" w. Ray Gilbert m. Gabriel Ruiz
- "Don't Smoke in Bed" w.m. Willard Robison
- "Don't Telephone, Don't Telegraph, Tell a Woman" w.m. Al Stewart and Tex Williams
- "Down by the Station" adapted from a children's song by Lee Ricks and Slim Gaillard
- "Down the Old Spanish Trail" Kenneth Leslie-Smith and Jimmy Kennedy
- "The Dream of Olwen" w. Winifred May m. Charles Williams
- "The Egg and I", w. Bert Kalmar, Al Jolson, and Harry Akst m. Harry Ruby
- "Everybody Loves Somebody" w. Irving Taylor m. Ken Lane
- "Everybody's Gonna Have A Wonderful Time Up There" Lee Roy Abernathy
- "Ev'ry Day I Love You" w. Sammy Cahn m. Jule Styne
- "A Fella with an Umbrella" w.m. Irving Berlin
- "For Every Man There's a Woman" w. Leo Robin m. Harold Arlen. Introduced by Tony Martin in the 1948 film Casbah
- "Four Brothers" by Jimmy Giuffre
- "Fun And Fancy Free" w.m. Bennie Benjamin and George David Weiss
- "Galway Bay" w.m. Dr Arthur Colahan
- "The Gentleman Is A Dope" w. Oscar Hammerstein II m. Richard Rodgers
- "Good Rockin' Tonight" w.m. Roy Brown
- "The Heather On The Hill" w. Alan Jay Lerner m. Frederick Loewe
- "Here Comes Santa Claus" w.m. Gene Autry and Oakley Haldeman
- "Here I'll Stay" w. Alan Jay Lerner m. Kurt Weill
- "Hooray For Love" w. Leo Robin m. Harold Arlen. Introduced by Tony Martin and Yvonne DeCarlo in the 1948 film Casbah
- "A Hundred And Sixty Acres" w.m. David Kapp
- "Hurry On Down" w.m. Nellie Lutcher
- "I Like'em Fat Like That" w.m. Claude Demetrius, Louis Jordan, J. Mayo Williams
- "I Still Get Jealous" w. Sammy Cahn m. Jule Styne
- "I Tipped My Hat And Slowly Rode Away" w.m. Larry Marks and Dick Charles
- "I Wish I Didn't Love You So" w.m. Frank Loesser
- "Ichabod" Don Raye and Gene De Paul
- "If You Stub Your Toe on the Moon" w. Johnny Burke m. Jimmy Van Heusen
- "I'll Dance at Your Wedding" w. Herb Magidson m. Ben Oakland
- "I'll Go Home with Bonnie Jean" w. Alan Jay Lerner m. Frederick Loewe
- "I'm My Own Grandpa" w.m. Dwight Latham and Moe Jaffe
- "It Only Happens When I Dance with You" w.m. Irving Berlin
- "It Takes a Long, Long Train with a Red Caboose" w.m. Larry Marks and Dick Charles
- "It Was Written in the Stars" w. Leo Robin m. Harold Arlen
- "It's a Most Unusual Day" w. Harold Adamson m. Jimmy McHugh
- "It's Magic" w. Sammy Cahn m. Jule Styne
- "Ivy" w.m. Hoagy Carmichael
- "Life Gets Tee-jus, Don't It" w.m. Carson Robison
- "A Little Bird Told Me" w.m. Harvey O. Brooks
- "Look To The Rainbow" w. E.Y. Harburg m. Burton Lane
- "Love Is Where You Find It" w. Earl K. Brent m. Nacio Herb Brown
- "Love Somebody" w.m. Joan Whitney and Alex Kramer
- "The Maharajah Of Magador" w.m. Lewis Harris and John Jacob Loeb
- "Mam'selle" w. Mack Gordon m. Edmund Goulding
- "Mañana (Is Soon Enough for Me)" w.m. Peggy Lee and Dave Barbour
- "Maybe It's Because I'm a Londoner" w.m. Hubert Gregg
- "Maybe You'll Be There" w. Sammy Gallop m. Rube Bloom
- "Nature Boy" w.m. eden ahbez
- "Near You" w. Kermit Goell m. Francis Craig
- "The Night Has A Thousand Eyes" w. Buddy Bernier m. Jerome (Jerry) Brainin
- "Now Is The Hour" w.m. Maewa Kaihan, Clement Scott and Dorothy Stewart
- "On a Slow Boat to China" w.m. Frank Loesser
- "Once And For Always" w. Johnny Burke m. Jimmy Van Heusen
- "Papa Won't You Dance with Me?" w. Sammy Cahn m. Jule Styne
- "Pass That Peace Pipe" w. Ralph Blane m. Hugh Martin
- "Perhaps, Perhaps, Perhaps" w.(Eng) Joe Davis (Span.) Osvaldo Farrés m. Osvaldo Farrés Quizás, Quizás, Quizás
- "Please Stop Playing Those Blues, Boys" Claude Demetrius and Fleecie Moore
- "Put 'Em in a Box, Tie 'Em with a Ribbon, and Throw 'Em in the Deep Blue Sea" w. Sammy Cahn m. Jule Styne
- "Rhode Island Is Famous for You" w. Howard Dietz m. Arthur Schwartz
- "Serenade Of The Bells" w.m. Kay Twomey, Al Goodhart and Al Urbano
- "Sixteen Tons" w.m. Merle Travis
- "Smoke! Smoke! Smoke!" w.m. Merle Travis and Tex Williams
- "Steppin' Out with My Baby" w.m. Irving Berlin
- "Tallahassee" w.m. Frank Loesser
- "Tell Me Marianne" w.m. Edgardo Donato and Bob Musel
- "There But For You Go I" w. Alan Jay Lerner m. Frederick Loewe
- "Toolie Oolie Doolie" w.(Eng) Vaughn Horton (Ger) Arthur Beul m. Arthur Beul
- "The Turntable Song" w. Leo Robin m. John Green
- "Waitin' For My Dearie" w. Alan Jay Lerner m. Frederick Loewe
- "What Good Would the Moon Be?" w. Langston Hughes m. Kurt Weill. Introduced by Anne Jeffreys in the musical Street Scene
- "What's Good About Goodbye?" w. Leo Robin m. Harold Arlen. Introduced by Tony Martin in the 1948 film Casbah
- "When I'm Not Near The Girl I Love" w. E. Y. Harburg m. Burton Lane Introduced by David Wayne in the Broadway production of Finian's Rainbow
- "Woody Woodpecker" w.m. George Tibbles and Ramez Idriss
- "You Do" w. Mack Gordon m. Josef Myrow
- "You Don't Have To Know The Language" w. Johnny Burke m. Jimmy Van Heusen
- "You Were Only Fooling" w. William E. Faber and Fred Meadows m. Larry Fotine

== Classical music ==
=== Premieres ===
Composer	Composition	Date	Location	Performers
Arnold, Malcolm	Symphony for Strings	1947-04-29	London	Riddick String Orchestra – Kathleen Riddick
Barber, Samuel	Suite from Medea	1947-12-05	Philadelphia	Philadelphia Orchestra – Ormandy
Boulez, Pierre	Flute Sonatina	1947-02-28	Brussels	Van Boterdael, Mercenier
Britten, Benjamin	Canticle I: My Beloved is Mine and I am His	1947-11-01	London	Pears, Britten
Carter, Elliott	Piano Sonata	1947-03-05 (Note: Concert premiere. The Sonata was recorded by Webster Aiken for a radio broadcast one month earlier, on February 7.)	New York City	Sykes
Cerha, Friedrich	Märchenland, pieces for piano	1947-02-25	Vienna	Schnürl
Chagrin, Francis	Prelude and Fugue for Orchestra	1947-09-02	London (Proms)	London Philharmonic – Cameron
Copland, Aaron	In the Beginning	1947-05-02	Cambridge, Massachusetts	Tangeman / Harvard University Choir – Shaw
Dallapiccola, Luigi	Liriche Greche I: Cinque Frammenti di Saffo (1942)	1947-07-07	Turin	László / [unknown ensemble] – Caracciolo
Dallapiccola, Luigi	Two Etudes for Violin and Piano	1947-04-28	Basel	Materassi, Dallapiccola
Dallapiccola, Luigi	Two Pieces for Orchestra	1947-11-03	London	Turin Radio Symphony – Rossi
Duruflé, Maurice	Requiem	1947-11-02	Paris	Bouvier, Mauranne / French National Radio Symphony Orchestra and Choir – Désormière
Enescu, George	Piano Quartet No. 2	1947-10-31	Washington, DC (Library of Congress)	Albeneri Trio with Katims
Engelmann, Hans Ulrich	Violin Sonata	1947-07-27	Darmstädter Ferienkurse	Seitz, Baer
Englund, Einar	War Symphony (Symphony No. 1)	1947-01-17	Helsinki	Helsinki Philharmonic – Funtek
Fortner, Wolfgang	Shakespeare-Songs	1947-07-25	Darmstädter Ferienkurse	Baum, Roloff
Foss, Lukas	Song of Songs	1947-03-07	Boston	Boston Symphony – Koussevitzky
Ginastera, Alberto	Duo for Flute and Oboe	1947-02-23	New York City	Smith, Wann
Ginastera, Alberto	Hieremiae Prophetae Lamentationes	1947-07-21	Buenos Aires	Lagun Onak Choir – Castro
Ginastera, Alberto	Pampeana No. 1, for violin and piano	1947-02-23	New York City	De Conte, Tosar
Ginastera, Alberto	Suite de danzas criollas	1947-07-26	Buenos Aires	Firkusny
Hartmann, Karl Amadeus	China Kampft, overture	1947-07-27	Darmstädter Ferienkurse	Landestheater Orchestra – Scherchen
Heiss, Hermann	Inventions for Violin and Cello	1947-07-12	Darmstädter Ferienkurse	Müller-Gündner, Day
Heiss, Hermann	Lieder der Liebe	1947-07-13	Darmstädter Ferienkurse	U. Heiss, H. Heiss
Henze, Hans Wener	Flute Sonatina	1947-07-27	Darmstädter Ferienkurse	Redel, Roloff
Henze, Hans Werner	Concertino for Piano, Winds and Percussion	1947-10-15	Baden-Baden, Germany	SWF Symphony – Egk
Henze, Hans Werner	String Quartet No. 1	1947-04-??	Heidelberg	Freund Quartet
Honegger, Arthur	Deliciae basiliensis (Symphony No. 4)	1947-01-21	Basel	Basel Chamber Orchestra – Sacher
Jacob, Gordon	Bassoon Concerto	1947-08-20	London (Proms)	Camden / BBC Symphony – Boult
Jolivet, André	Piano Sonata No. 1	1947-01-27	Paris	Grimaud
Jolivet, André	Psyché, symphonic mouvement	1947-03-05	Brussels	[unknown orchestra] – André
Khachaturian, Aram	Symphony-Poem (Symphony No. 3)	1947-12-13	Leningrad	Leningrad Philharmonic – Mravinsky
Korngold, Erich Wolfgang	Violin Concerto	1947-02-15	St. Louis	Heifetz / St. Louis Symphony – Golschmann
Krenek, Ernst	Symphony No. 4	1947-11-27	New York City	New York Philharmonic – Mitropoulos
Lewis, Anthony	Elegy and Capriccio for Trumpet and Orchestra	1947-08-01	London (Proms)	Eskdale / London Symphony – Sargent
Liebermann, Rolf	Furioso	1947-07-27	Darmstädter Ferienkurse	Landestheater Orchestra – Scherchen
Maderna, Bruno	Introduzione e Passacaglia "Lauda Sion Salvatorem"	1947-04-03	Florence	Florence Communal Theatre Symphony – Maderna
Malipiero, Gian Francesco	Sinfonia concertante in eco (Symphony No. 5)	1947-11-03	London	[unknown performers]
Martinů, Bohuslav	Symphony No. 5	1947-05-28	Prague Spring International Music Festival	Czech Philharmonic – Kubelik
Martinů, Bohuslav	Toccata e due canzoni	1947-01-21	Basel	Basel Chamber Orchestra – Sacher
Myaskovsky, Nikolai	Pathetic Overture	1947-10-19	Moscow	USSR State Symphony – Gauk
Myaskovsky, Nikolai	String Quartet No. 12	1947-11-30	Moscow	Beethoven Quartet
Myaskovsky, Nikolai	The Kremlin at Night, cantata-nocturne	1947-11-15	Moscow	Moscow Conservatory Symphony Orchestra and Choir – Anosov
Persichetti, Vincent	Symphony No. 3	1947-11-21	Philadelphia	Philadelphia Orchestra – Ormandy
Prokofiev, Sergei	Symphony No. 6	1947-10-11	Leningrad	Leningrad Philharmonic – Mravinsky
Schoenberg, Arnold	String Trio	1947-05-01	Cambridge, Massachusetts	Members of the Walden Quartet
Sessions, Roger	Symphony No. 2	1947-01-09	San Francisco	San Francisco Symphony – Monteux
Sessions, Roger	Violin Concerto (1935)	1947-11-14	Minneapolis	Krasner / Minneapolis Symphony – Mitropoulos
Stravinsky, Igor	Concerto in D for strings	1947-01-27	Basel	Basel Chamber Orchestra – Sacher
Tubin, Eduard	Symphony No. 5	1947-11-16	Stockholm	Stockholm Philharmonic – Carl Garaguly
Villa-Lobos, Heitor	Bachianas brasileiras No. 3 (1938)	1947-02-19	New York	José Vieira Brandão (piano), CBS Orchestra) – Villa-Lobos
Villa-Lobos, Heitor	Bachianas brasileiras No. 8 (1944)	1947-08-06	Rome	Santa Cecilia Academy Orchestra – Villa-Lobos
Walton, William	String Quartet in A minor	1947-05-04	London	Blech Quartet
Webern, Anton	Five Canons on Latin Texts for soprano and two clarinets	1947-06-18	Vienna	Setingruber, Wildgans, Bartosek
Zimbalist, Efrem	Violin Concerto	1947-11-28	Philadelphia	Philadelphia Orchestra – Ormandy
Zimmermann, Bernd Alois	Concerto for Orchestra	1947-09-22	Cologne	Gürzenich Orchestra – Wand
Zimmermann, Bernd Alois	Sinfonia prosodica	1947-09-09	Mönchengladbach, Germany	Vestisches Sinfonie – Decker

=== Compositions ===
- Milton Babbitt – Three Compositions for Piano
- Samuel Barber – Knoxville: Summer of 1915
- Lennox Berkeley – Piano Concerto in B-flat
- Doreen Carwithen (Mary Alwyn) – ODTAA (One Damn Thing After Another)
- Paul Creston – Fantasy for Trombone
- George Crumb
  - Gethsemane for small orchestra
  - Three Early Songs for Voice and Piano
- David Diamond – String Quartet No. 3
- Maurice Duruflé – Requiem
- Henri Dutilleux – Oboe Sonata
- Vittorio Giannini – Variations on a Cantus Firmus
- Morton Gould – American Salute
- Vagn Holmboe – Symphony No. 6
- Charles Ives – Piano Sonata No. 2, Concord, Mass., 1840–60 (Concord Sonata, revised version)
- André Jolivet – Concerto for ondes Martenot and orchestra
- Miloslav Kabeláč – Overture No. 2 for large orchestra
- Aram Khachaturian – Symphony No. 3 (Symphony-Poem)
- Wojciech Kilar – Two Miniatures for Children for piano
- Witold Lutosławski – Symphony No. 1
- Gian Francesco Malipiero
  - Symphony No. 5 (Concertante in Eco)
  - Symphony No. 6 (degli Archi)
- Nikolai Myaskovsky
  - Pathetic Overture in C Minor, Op.76
  - String Quartet No. 12 in G, Op.77
- Sergei Prokofiev
  - Symphony No. 6 in E-flat Minor
  - Symphony No. 4 in C Major (extensively revised version)
- Edmund Rubbra – Symphony No. 5
- Mátyás Seiber – Ulysses (cantata)
- Harold Shapero – Symphony for Classical Orchestra
- Othmar Schoeck – Concerto for Cello and String Orchestra, Op. 61
- Arnold Schoenberg
  - A Survivor from Warsaw
- Igor Stravinsky
  - Orpheus (ballet)
  - Petrushka (ballet) (2nd version)
- Edgard Varèse – Tuning Up
- Heitor Villa-Lobos – String Quartet No. 11
- William Walton – String Quartet in A minor (1945–47)

== Opera ==
- Benjamin Britten – Albert Herring
- Gottfried von Einem – Dantons Tod
- Gian Carlo Menotti – The Telephone
- Vano Muradeli – The Great Friendship
- Ildebrando Pizzetti – L'Oro
- Francis Poulenc – Les mamelles de Tirésias
- Bernard Rogers – The Warrior
- Virgil Thomson – The Mother of Us All

== Film ==
- Brian Easdale – Black Narcissus
- Bernard Herrmann – The Ghost and Mrs. Muir
- Erich Wolfgang Korngold – Escape Me Never
- Constant Lambert – Anna Karenina
- Alfred Newman – Captain from Castile
- David Raksin – Forever Amber
- Dmitri Shostakovich – Pirogov
- Max Steiner – Pursued
- Franz Waxman – Dark Passage

== Musical theater ==
- Allegro Broadway production
- Angel in the Wings Broadway production
- Annie Get Your Gun (Irving Berlin) – London production opened at the Coliseum on June 7 and ran for 1304 performances
- Barefoot Boy with Cheek Broadway production
- Bless the Bride (Vivian Ellis and A. P. Herbert) – London production opened at the Adelphi Theatre on April 26 and ran for 886 performances. Starring Georges Guétary, Lizbeth Webb, Anona Winn and Brian Reece. Features "I Was Never Kissed Before", "Ma Belle Marguerite" and "This Is My Lovely Day"
- Bonanza Bound Philadelphia production
- Brigadoon (Alan Jay Lerner and Frederick Loewe) – Broadway production
- Finian's Rainbow (Burton Lane and E. Y. Harburg)
  - Broadway production opened on January 10 at the 46th Street Theatre and ran for 725 performances
  - London production opened on October 21 at the Palace Theatre and ran for 55 performances
- High Button Shoes (Jule Styne and Sammy Cahn) – Broadway production
- Oklahoma! (Rodgers & Hammerstein) – London production opened at the Theatre Royal on April 29 and ran for 1543 performances
- The Red Mill London revival
- The Shape of Things! East Hampton production
- Street Scene Broadway production
- Together Again London revue starring The Crazy Gang opened at the Victoria Palace Theatre on April 7 and ran for 1566 performances
- Tuppence Coloured London revue
- Under the Counter Broadway production opened at the Shubert Theatre on October 3. Cicely Courtneidge reprised her starring role from the London production but the show closed after only 27 performances

== Musical films ==
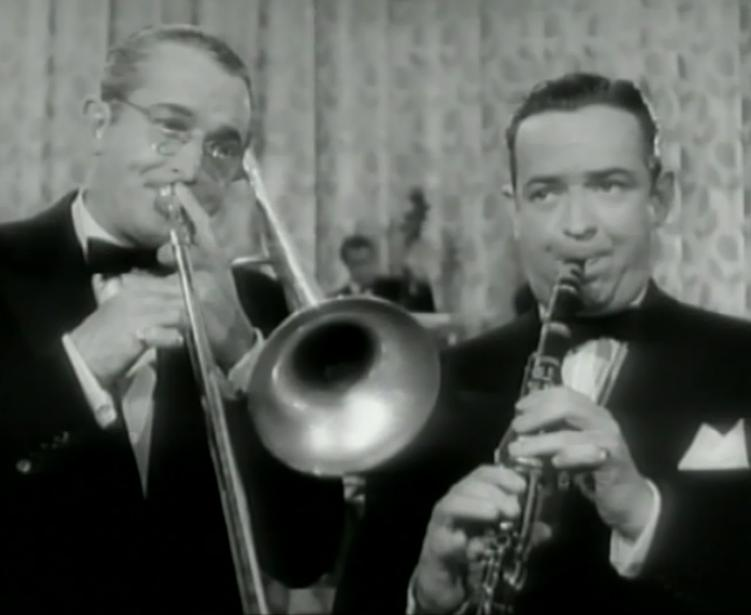
Tommy and Jimmy, The Fabulous Dorseys

- Carnival in Costa Rica
- Con la música por dentro, starring Germán Valdés, Marcelo Chávez and Marga López
- Copacabana
- Don't Give Up (Tappa inte sugen), starring Nils Poppe and Annalisa Ericson
- Down to Earth
- Etoile Sans Lumiere (Star Without Light)
- The Fabulous Dorseys
- Fiesta
- Fun and Fancy Free animated film includes Bongo and Mickey And The Beanstalk
- Golden Earrings
- Good News
- I Wonder Who's Kissing Her Now
- I'll Be Yours starring Deanna Durbin, Tom Drake, William Bendix and Adolphe Menjou. Directed by William A. Seiter.
- It Happened in Brooklyn starring Frank Sinatra, Peter Lawford, Kathryn Grayson and Jimmy Durante. Directed by Richard Whorf.
- Ladies' Man
- Linda Be Good starring Elyse Knox, Marie Wilson and John Hubbard. Directed by Frank McDonald. Directed by Frank McDonald.
- Little Miss Broadway starring Jean Porter, John Shelton and Ruth Donnelly. Directed by Arthur Dreifuss.
- Living in a Big Way starring Gene Kelly
- Mother Wore Tights starring Betty Grable and Dan Dailey
- My Favorite Brunette
- My Wild Irish Rose
- New Orleans
- Night Song
- Nora Prentiss
- Northwest Outpost
- The Perils of Pauline
- The Road to Rio
- The Secret Life of Walter Mitty
- Shadiyat al-Wadi, starring Layla Murad
- The Shocking Miss Pilgrim released January 4 starring Betty Grable and Dick Haymes
- Something in the Wind
- Song of Scheherazade
- Star Without Light
- This Time for Keeps
- The Trouble with Women
- The Unfinished Dance
- Variety Girl
- Welcome, Stranger

== Births ==
- January 6 – Sandy Denny, folk singer (Fairport Convention) (died 1978)
- January 7 (or 1) – Mohammad-Reza Lotfi, Iranian setar player and composer (died 2014)
- January 8
  - David Bowie, singer-songwriter (died 2016)
  - Terry Sylvester, pop guitarist and singer (The Hollies)
- January 18 – John O'Conor, Irish pianist
- January 19 – Rod Evans (Deep Purple, Captain Beyond)
- January 20 – George Grantham (Poco)
- January 21 – Pye Hastings (Caravan)
- January 24 – Warren Zevon, singer-songwriter (died 2003)
- January 29 – David Byron, lead vocalist (Uriah Heep, Spice) (died 1985)
- January 30 – Steve Marriott (Small Faces, Humble Pie) (died 1991)
- February 3
  - Dave Davies, singer-guitarist (The Kinks)
  - Melanie (Safka), folk singer-songwriter (died 2024)
- February 7 – John Weathers (Gentle Giant, Man)
- February 9 – Joe Ely, singer, guitarist and songwriter
- February 11 – Derek Shulman (Gentle Giant)
- February 14 – Tim Buckley, singer-songwriter and musician (died 1975)
- February 15 – John Coolidge Adams, composer
- February 18 – Dennis DeYoung (Styx)
- February 24 – Rupert Holmes, singer-songwriter
- February 26 – Sandie Shaw, singer
- March 3 – Jennifer Warnes, American singer
- March 5 – Clodagh Rodgers, Northern Irish singer (died 2025)
- March 6 – Kiki Dee, English singer
- March 8 – Michael Allsup, American guitarist (Three Dog Night)
- March 10 – Tom Scholz, American rock musician (Boston)
- March 11 – Mark Stein, Ameerican musician (Vanilla Fudge)
- March 12 – Johnny Young, Dutch-born Australian singer-songwriter (died 2026)
- March 14
  - Jona Lewie, English singer-songwriter and keyboard player
  - Peter Skellern, English singer-songwriter and pianist (died 2017)
- March 15 – Ry Cooder, American guitarist, singer and composer
- March 18 – B. J. Wilson, English drummer (Procol Harum) (died 1990)
- March 24 – Mike Kellie, English drummer (Spooky Tooth) (died 2017)
- March 25
  - Elton John, British pianist and singer-songwriter
  - John Rowles, New Zealand singer
- March 29 – Bobby Kimball, American singer (Toto)
- April 2
  - Paquita la del Barrio, Mexican singer (died 2025)
  - Emmylou Harris, American country singer-songwriter
- April 7
  - Patricia Bennett, American rock singer (The Chiffons)
  - Florian Schneider, German electronic musician (Kraftwerk) (died 2020)
- April 8
  - Steve Howe, English guitarist (Yes)
  - Larry Norman, American singer-songwriter and producer (died 2008)
- April 10 – Bunny Wailer, Jamaican reggae singer-songwriter and percussionist (died 2021)
- April 16
  - Ján Lehotský, Slovak composer
  - Gerry Rafferty, Scottish singer-songwriter (died 2011)
- April 19
  - Murray Perahia, American pianist
  - Mark Volman, American rock singer-songwriter (The Turtles, Flo & Eddie) (died 2025)
- April 21
  - Iggy Pop, American rock singer-songwriter
  - John Weider, English rock musician (John Mayall's Bluesbreakers)
- April 23 – Glenn Cornick, English bass guitarist (Jethro Tull) (died 2014)
- April 27 – Pete Ham, Welsh singer-songwriter (Badfinger) (died 1975)
- April 29 – Tommy James, American singer-songwriter and producer (Tommy James and the Shondells)
- May 7 – Stefka Evstatieva, Bulgarian soprano (died 2025)
- May 8
  - Felicity Lott, English soprano (died 2026)
  - Phil Sawyer, English guitarist (The Spencer Davis Group, Jefferson Starship)
- May 10 – Jay Ferguson, American muisician (Spirit)
- May 11 – Butch Trucks, American drummer (The Allman Brothers Band) (died 2017)
- May 13 – Pete Overend Watts, British rock bassist and vocalist (Mott the Hoople, Mott, British Lions) (died 2017)
- May 14
  - Al Ciner, American guitarist (Three Dog Night)
  - Joaquin Diaz González, Spanish multi-instrumentalist, singer, folklorist and ethnomusicologist
- May 15 – Graeham Goble, Australian rock musician (Little River Band)
- May 16
  - Barbara Lee, rock singer (The Chiffons)
  - Darrell Sweet, Scottish hard rock drummer (Nazareth) (died 1999)
- May 19
  - Paul Brady, Irish singer-songwriter
  - David Helfgott, Australian classical pianist
- May 20 – Steve Currie, English bassist (T. Rex) (died 1981)
- May 21 – Bill Champlin, American musician (Chicago)
- May 31 – Junior Campbell, Scottish singer-songwriter
- June 1 – Ronnie Wood, rock guitarist (The Faces; The Rolling Stones)
- June 3
  - Mickey Finn, glam rock drummer (T. Rex) (died 2003)
  - Shuki Levy, composer
- June 5
  - Laurie Anderson, singer-songwriter
  - Tom Evans, rock singer-songwriter (Badfinger) (died 1983)
  - Freddie Stone, guitarist (Sly and the Family Stone)
- June 8
  - Mick Box, hard rock guitarist (Uriah Heep)
  - Julie Driscoll, singer (Brian Auger and the Trinity)
- June 14 – Barry Melton, rock guitarist (Country Joe and the Fish)
- June 15 – Paul Patterson, composer
- June 17
  - Gregg Rolie, singer and keyboard player (Santana, Journey)
  - Paul Young, lead vocalist (Sad Café), singer & percussionist (Mike + The Mechanics) (died 2000)
- June 20 – Dolores "LaLa" Brooks, singer (The Crystals)
- June 22 – Howard Kaylan, rock singer (The Turtles, The Mothers of Invention, Flo & Eddie)
- June 24 – Mick Fleetwood, rock drummer (Fleetwood Mac)
- July 7
  - David Hodo, American singer and actor (Village People)
  - Rob Townsend, drummer (Family)
- July 8 – Jonathan Kelly, singer-songwriter
- July 9
  - Mitch Mitchell, drummer (The Jimi Hendrix Experience) (died 2008)
  - Haruomi Hosono, Japanese musician, singer-songwriter and record producer
- July 10 – Arlo Guthrie, folk singer
- July 11 – John Holt, singer (The Paragons) (died 2014)
- July 12 – Wilko Johnson, pub rock guitarist, singer-songwriter (Dr. Feelgood) and actor (died 2022)
- July 15
  - Peter Banks, guitarist (Yes, The Syn) (died 2013)
  - Roky Erickson (The 13th Floor Elevators) (died 2019)
- July 19
  - Bernie Leadon (The Flying Burrito Brothers, Eagles)
  - Brian May, guitarist (Queen)
- July 20 – Carlos Santana, guitarist
- July 22 – Don Henley (Eagles)
- July 23 – David Essex, singer and actor
- July 24
  - Peter Serkin, classical pianist (died 2020)
  - Chris Townson, drummer (John's Children, The Who) (died 2008)
- August 5
  - Rick Derringer (The McCoys)
  - Gregory Leskiw (The Guess Who)
- August 6 – Dennis Alcapone, reggae deejay and producer
- August 9 – Barbara Mason, singer
- August 10
  - Dimitri Alexeev, pianist
  - Ian Anderson, singer and flautist (Jethro Tull)
- August 14 – Maddy Prior, folk singer
- August 17 – Gary Talley, guitarist (The Box Tops)
- August 20 – James Pankow, brass player (Chicago)
- September 3 – Eric Bell, guitarist (Thin Lizzy)
- September 5 – Buddy Miles (died 2008)
- September 12 – Darryl DeLoach, vocalist (Iron Butterfly) (died 2002)
- September 17
  - Lol Creme, singer (10cc)
  - Gordon Edwards (The Kinks)
- September 21 – Don Felder (Eagles)
- September 23 – Jerry Corbetta (Sugarloaf) (died 2016)
- September 26 – Lynn Anderson, country-music singer (died 2015)
- September 27 – Meat Loaf, singer (died 2022)
- September 30 – Marc Bolan, singer-songwriter (died 1977)
- October 4 – Jim Fielder, bass guitarist (Blood, Sweat & Tears, Buffalo Springfield)
- October 5 – Brian Johnson, singer (AC/DC)
- October 9 – France Gall, yé-yé singer (died 2018)
- October 10 – Norman Carl Odam, the Legendary Stardust Cowboy, novelty artist
- October 12 – George Lam, Hong Kong singer and actor
- October 13 – Sammy Hagar, rock singer-songwriter and guitarist (Montrose, Van Halen)
- October 16 – Bob Weir, rock singer-songwriter and guitarist (Grateful Dead) (died 2026)
- October 17 – Michael McKean, comic actor, singer and composer (This Is Spinal Tap)
- October 18 – Laura Nyro, singer, pianist and composer (died 1997)
- October 21 – Tetsu Yamauchi, bass guitarist (Free, The Faces)
- October 23 – Greg Ridley, bass guitarist (Spooky Tooth, Humble Pie) (died 2003)
- October 30 – Timothy B. Schmit, rock singer-songwriter and bass guitarist (Poco, Eagles)
- November 2 – Dave Pegg, multi-instrumentalist (Fairport Convention, Jethro Tull), bassist (Ian Campbell Folk Group)
- November 5
  - Rubén Juárez, Argentinian singer-songwriter and bandoneon player (died 2010)
  - Peter Noone, singer, "Herman" of Herman's Hermits
- November 8 – Minnie Riperton, singer (died 1979)
- November 10
  - Greg Lake progressive rock singer-songwriter (Emerson, Lake & Palmer) (died 2016)
  - Dave Loggins, singer-songwriter
- November 12 – Buck Dharma, hard rock guitarist and singer (Blue Öyster Cult)
- November 20 – Joe Walsh, hard rock singer-songwriter and guitarist (James Gang, Eagles)
- November 29 – Ronnie Montrose, rock guitarist (Montrose, Gamma) (died 2012)
- December 4 – Terry Woods, folk rock musician (The Pogues)
- December 5
  - Egberto Gismonti, Brazilian composer, guitarist and pianist
  - Jim Messina (Buffalo Springfield, Loggins and Messina)
  - Rick Wills, bass guitarist (Foreigner)
- December 8 – Gregg Allman, singer, guitarist and songwriter (died 2017)
- December 12 – Vin Scelsa, radio DJ
- December 21 – Paco de Lucía, flamenco guitarist (died 2014)
- December 27 – Tracy Nelson, singer (Mother Earth)
- December 28 – Dick Diamonde, bassist (The Easybeats) (died 2024)
- December 29 – Cozy Powell, drummer (died 1998)
- December 30 – Jeff Lynne, singer-songwriter and producer (The Move, Electric Light Orchestra)
- December 31 – Burton Cummings, rock singer-songwriter (The Guess Who)

== Deaths ==
- January 3 – Gus Wickie, singer and voice actor, 61
- January 11 – Eva Tanguay, singer, vaudeville star, 67
- January 16
  - Sonny Berman, jazz trumpeter, 21 (suspected drug overdose)
  - Fate Marable, jazz pianist and bandleader, 56 (pneumonia)
- January 26 – Grace Moore, operatic soprano, 48 (plane crash)
- January 28 – Reynaldo Hahn, French composer and conductor, 71
- February 5 – Salvatore Cardillo, songwriter, 72
- February 6 – Luigi Russolo, composer, 61
- February 22 – Fannie Charles Dillon, composer, 65
- March 5 – Alfredo Casella, composer, 63
- March 28 – Rudolph Simonsen, composer, 57
- April 22 – Charles Friant, tenor, 57
- May 2 – Louie Henri, singer and actress, 83
- May 6 – Louise Homer, operatic contralto, 76
- May 27 – Claire Croiza, mezzo-soprano and singing teacher, 64
- May 30 – Georg Ludwig von Trapp, head of the singing von Trapp family, 67
- July 1 – Clarence Lucas, composer and conductor, 80
- July 12 – Jimmie Lunceford, jazz saxophonist and bandleader, 45 (cardiac arrest)
- July 13 – Marcel Varnel, Broadway director, 52 (car crash)
- July 15 – Walter Donaldson, songwriter, 54
- July 24 – Ernest Austin, English composer, 72
- September 18 – Bert Kalmar, lyricist, 63
- September 28 – Francisco Santiago, "Father of Kundiman Art Song", 58
- September 29 – Jan Hambourg, violinist, 65
- October 6
  - Janet Fairbank, opera singer, 44 (leukaemia)
  - Leevi Madetoja, composer
- October 30 – Syech Albar
- November 14 – Joseph Allard, French-Canadian fiddler, 74
- November 16 – Carl Adolph Preyer, compose, pianist, 83
- November 26 – John McKenna, traditional Irish flute player, 67
- November 28 – Georg Schnéevoigt, conductor and composer, 75
- December 14 – Will Fyffe, Scottish comedian and singer, 62
- December 16 – Cesare Sodero, conductor, 61
- date unknown –
  - Ilia Trilling, Yiddish theatre producer and composer
