= List of Most Played Juke Box Race Records number ones of 1947 =

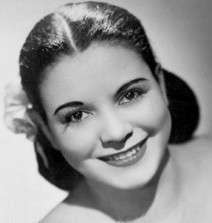
"I Want to Be Loved" was the only chart-topper for Savannah Churchill.

In 1947, Billboard magazine published a chart ranking the top-performing songs in the United States in African-American-oriented musical genres under the title of Most-Played Juke Box Race Records; placings were based on a weekly survey among jukebox operators. The chart is considered to be part of the lineage of the magazine's multimetric R&B chart, which since 2005 has been published under the title Hot R&B/Hip Hop Songs. The term "race records" was then in common usage for recordings by black artists.

In the issue of Billboard dated January 4, two singles tied for the number-one position, both by Louis Jordan and his Tympany Five. That week's chart listed only five records, four of which were by Jordan. The following week, "Ain't Nobody Here but Us Chickens", one of the two songs which had shared the top spot in the year's first issue, held it in its own right, and remained atop the listing without interruption through the issue of Billboard dated April 19, a total of 16 consecutive weeks at number one. Jordan also spent short spells at number one with "Texas and Pacific" and "Jack You're Dead", and 14 weeks in the top spot with "Boogie Woogie Blue Plate". Those five songs spent a total of 40 weeks at number one during the year, or 41 if the week of January 4 is double-counted. Jordan was by far the most successful artist of the 1940s on Billboard's R&B charts. His tally of 18 chart-toppers was a record which would stand until the 1980s, and he spent 113 weeks at number one,^{[a]} a record which would still stand in the 21st century. Jordan's success fell away in the 1950s, but his music is considered to have been hugely influential on the development of both R&B and rock and roll.

Only three acts other than Jordan topped the chart during 1947, all of whom did so for the first time. In May, Savannah Churchill and the Sentimentalists reached number one with "I Want to Be Loved". It would prove to be the only number one for Churchill, whose R&B chart career was short-lived and had come to an end by 1949. Her backing group the Sentimentalists would change their name to the Four Tunes and achieve R&B and pop success until the mid-1950s, but without any further number ones. In Churchill's second week at number one, her single tied for the top spot with "Old Maid Boogie" by Eddie Vinson and his Orchestra, the first chart-topper and indeed first chart entry for Vinson, nicknamed "Cleanhead"; as with Churchill, it would be the only number one of his chart career, which was short-lived. In November, "(Opportunity Knocks But Once) Snatch and Grab It" gave Julia Lee and her Boy Friends their first number one; the single was the year's final chart-topper.

== Chart history ==
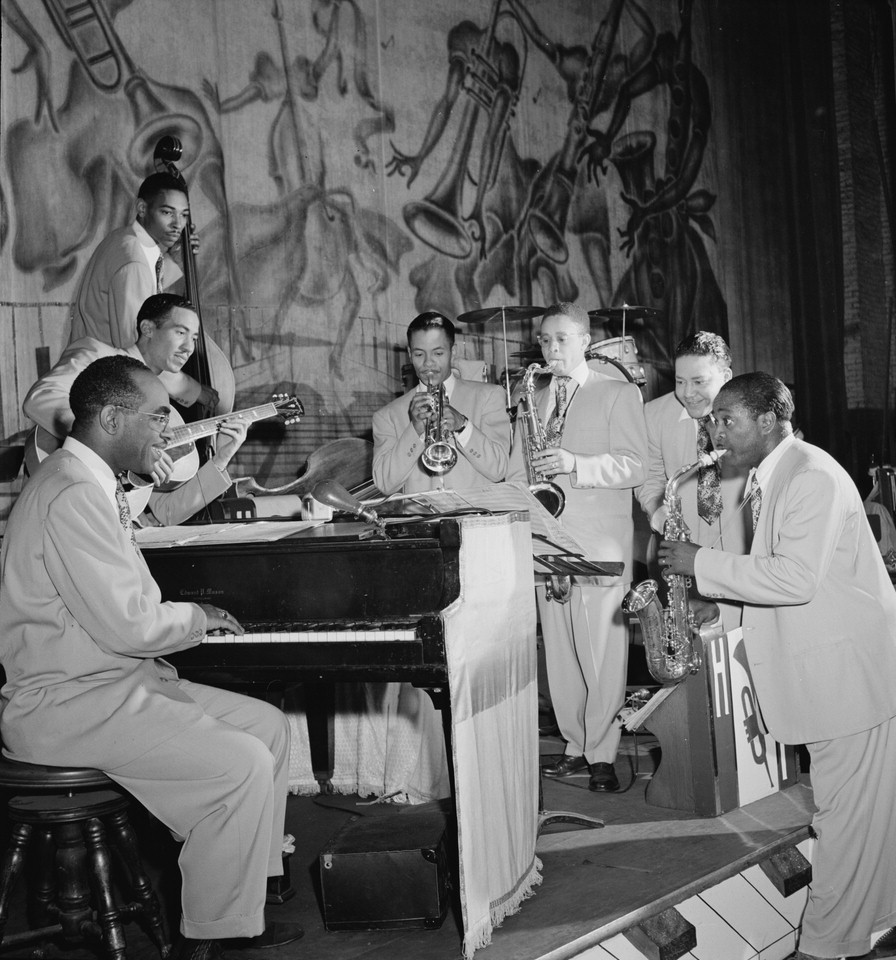
Louis Jordan and his Tympany Five had five number ones in 1947.

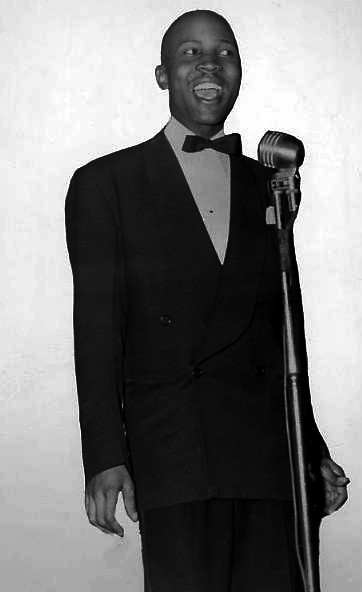
Eddie Vinson topped the chart with "Old Maid Boogie".

Chart history
Issue date	Title	Artist(s)	Ref.
January 4^{[b]}	"Ain't That Just Like a Woman"	Louis Jordan and his Tympany Five	
January 4^{[b]}	"Ain't Nobody Here but Us Chickens"	Louis Jordan and his Tympany Five	
January 11	"Ain't Nobody Here but Us Chickens"	Louis Jordan and his Tympany Five	
January 18	"Ain't Nobody Here but Us Chickens"	Louis Jordan and his Tympany Five	
January 25	"Ain't Nobody Here but Us Chickens"	Louis Jordan and his Tympany Five	
February 1	"Ain't Nobody Here but Us Chickens"	Louis Jordan and his Tympany Five	
February 8	"Ain't Nobody Here but Us Chickens"	Louis Jordan and his Tympany Five	
February 15	"Ain't Nobody Here but Us Chickens"	Louis Jordan and his Tympany Five	
February 22	"Ain't Nobody Here but Us Chickens"	Louis Jordan and his Tympany Five	
March 1	"Ain't Nobody Here but Us Chickens"	Louis Jordan and his Tympany Five	
March 8	"Ain't Nobody Here but Us Chickens"	Louis Jordan and his Tympany Five	
March 15	"Ain't Nobody Here but Us Chickens"	Louis Jordan and his Tympany Five	
March 22	"Ain't Nobody Here but Us Chickens"	Louis Jordan and his Tympany Five	
March 29	"Ain't Nobody Here but Us Chickens"	Louis Jordan and his Tympany Five	
April 5	"Ain't Nobody Here but Us Chickens"	Louis Jordan and his Tympany Five	
April 12	"Ain't Nobody Here but Us Chickens"	Louis Jordan and his Tympany Five	
April 19	"Ain't Nobody Here but Us Chickens"	Louis Jordan and his Tympany Five	
April 26	"Texas and Pacific"	Louis Jordan and his Tympany Five	
May 3	"Ain't Nobody Here but Us Chickens"	Louis Jordan and his Tympany Five	
May 10	"Texas and Pacific"	Louis Jordan and his Tympany Five	
May 17	"I Want to Be Loved"	Savannah Churchill and the Sentimentalists	
May 24^{[b]}	"I Want to Be Loved"	Savannah Churchill and the Sentimentalists	
May 24^{[b]}	"Old Maid Boogie"	Eddie Vinson and his Orchestra	
May 31	"I Want to Be Loved"	Savannah Churchill and the Sentimentalists	
June 7	"I Want to Be Loved"	Savannah Churchill and the Sentimentalists	
June 14	"I Want to Be Loved"	Savannah Churchill and the Sentimentalists	
June 21	"Old Maid Boogie"	Eddie Vinson and his Orchestra	
June 28 ^{[b]}	"Jack You're Dead"	Louis Jordan and his Tympany Five	
June 28 ^{[b]}	"I Want to Be Loved"	Savannah Churchill and the Sentimentalists	
July 5	"I Want to Be Loved"	Savannah Churchill and the Sentimentalists	
July 12	"Jack You're Dead"	Louis Jordan and his Tympany Five	
July 19	"Jack You're Dead"	Louis Jordan and his Tympany Five	
July 26	"Jack You're Dead"	Louis Jordan and his Tympany Five	
August 2	"I Want to Be Loved"	Savannah Churchill and Sentimentalists	
August 9	"Jack You're Dead"	Louis Jordan and his Tympany Five	
August 16	"Jack You're Dead"	Louis Jordan and his Tympany Five	
August 23	"Jack You're Dead"	Louis Jordan and his Tympany Five	
August 30	"Boogie Woogie Blue Plate"	Louis Jordan and his Tympany Five	
September 6	"Boogie Woogie Blue Plate"	Louis Jordan and his Tympany Five	
September 13	"Boogie Woogie Blue Plate"	Louis Jordan and his Tympany Five	
September 20	"Boogie Woogie Blue Plate"	Louis Jordan and his Tympany Five	
September 27	"Boogie Woogie Blue Plate"	Louis Jordan and his Tympany Five	
October 4	"Boogie Woogie Blue Plate"	Louis Jordan and his Tympany Five	
October 11	"Boogie Woogie Blue Plate"	Louis Jordan and his Tympany Five	
October 18	"Boogie Woogie Blue Plate"	Louis Jordan and his Tympany Five	
October 25	"Boogie Woogie Blue Plate"	Louis Jordan and his Tympany Five	
November 1	"Boogie Woogie Blue Plate"	Louis Jordan and his Tympany Five	
November 8	"Boogie Woogie Blue Plate"	Louis Jordan and his Tympany Five	
November 15	"Boogie Woogie Blue Plate"	Louis Jordan and his Tympany Five	
November 22	"(Opportunity Knocks But Once) Snatch and Grab It"	Julia Lee and her Boy Friends	
November 29	"Boogie Woogie Blue Plate"	Louis Jordan and his Tympany Five	
December 6	"(Opportunity Knocks But Once) Snatch and Grab It"	Julia Lee and her Boy Friends	
December 13	"Boogie Woogie Blue Plate"	Louis Jordan and his Tympany Five	
December 20	"(Opportunity Knocks But Once) Snatch and Grab It"	Julia Lee and her Boy Friends	
December 27	"(Opportunity Knocks But Once) Snatch and Grab It"	Julia Lee and her Boy Friends	

== Notes ==
a. Jordan's first 16 number ones occurred at a time when Billboard published only one R&B chart. His final two number ones occurred during a period when the magazine published two charts and each topped both listings, but the figure of 113 weeks at number one does not double-count weeks when he topped both.
b. Two songs tied for the number one position.
