= Billboard Most-Played Race Records of 1947 =

Billboard Most-Played Race Records of 1947 is a year-end chart compiled by Billboard magazine ranking the year's top race records based on the number of times the record was played on the nation's juke boxes. Billboard assigned point totals to each record based on its juke box plays, much like with its weekly Most-Played Juke Box Race Records chart.

Louis Jordan and His Tympany Five dominated the year-end chart with 10 ranked records, including the No. 1 record ("Ain't Nobody Here but Us Chickens") and five of the top ten.

Four separate recordings of the song "Open the Door, Richard!" were included on the year-end chart, including versions by Louis Jordan and His Tympany Five and Count Basie and His Orchestra.

"That's My Desire" by Frankie Laine was the only record by a white singer to make the list, ranked at No. 20. A cover of the song by the Hadda Brooks Trio ranked No. 25.

Billboard also awarded point totals to each of the labels with Decca (Louis Jordan's label) receiving 433 points, followed by Capitol (including Capitol Americana) with 120 points and Manor and Mercury with 77 points each.

Rank	Title	Artist(s)	Label	Points
1	"Ain't Nobody Here but Us Chickens"	Louis Jordan & His Tympany Five	Decca	93
2	"Boogie Woogie Blue Plate"	Louis Jordan & His Tympany Five	Decca	80
3	"I Want to Be Loved (But Only by You)"	Savannah Churchill & The Four Tunes	Manor	77
4	"Jack, You're Dead"	Louis Jordan & His Tympany Five	Decca	67
5	"Old Maid Boogie"	Eddie Vinson & His Orchestra	Mercury	63
6	"(Opportunity Knocks But Once) Snatch and Grab It"	Julia Lee & Her Boy Friends	Capitol Americana	45
7	"Let the Good Times Roll"	Louis Jordan & His Tympany Five	Decca	43
8	"Texas and Pacific"	Louis Jordan & His Tympany Five	Decca	37
9	"He's a Real Gone Guy"	Nellie Lutcher & Her Rhythm	Capitol Americana	33
10	"Hurry on Down"	Nellie Lutcher & Her Rhythm	Capitol Americana	28
11	"New Orleans Blues"	"Johnny Moore's Three Blazers"	Exclusive	27
12	"I Want to Be Loved (But Only by You)"	Lionel Hampton & His Hamptonians	Decca	23
13	"Across the Alley from the Alamo"	The Mills Brothers	Decca	22
14	"Open the Door, Richard!"	Louis Jordan & His Tympany Five	Decca	21
15	"Open the Door, Richard!"	Dusty Fletcher with Jimmy Jones & His Band	National	20
16	"Open the Door, Richard!"	Jack McVea & His All Stars	Black & White	19
17	"Hawk's Boogie"	Erskine Hawkins & His Orchestra	RCA Victor	17
17	"Since I Fell for You"	Annie Laurie with Paul Gayten & His Trio	DeLuxe	17
19	"Ain't That Just Like a Woman (They'll Do It Every Time)"	Louis Jordan & His Tympany Five	Decca	16
20	"Open the Door, Richard!"	Count Basie & His Orchestra (vocals Harry Edison, Bill Johnson)	RCA Victor	14
20	"That's My Desire"	Frankie Laine	Mercury	14
22	"Early in the Mornin'"	Louis Jordan & His Tympany Five	Decca	13
23	"Choo Choo Ch'Boogie"	Louis Jordan & His Tympany Five	Decca	12
24	"True Blues"	Roy Milton & His Solid Senders	Specialty	8
25	"(I Love You) For Sentimental Reasons"	The King Cole Trio	Capitol	7
25	"That's My Desire"	Hadda Brooks Trio	Modern Music	7
25	"Meet Me at No Special Place (And I'll Be There at No Particular Time)	The King Cole Trio	Capitol	7
28	"Don't You Think I Ought to Know?"	Bill Johnson & His Musical Notes	Queen	6
28	"Tanya"	Joe Liggins & His Honeydrippers	Exclusive	6
28	"Look Out"	Louis Jordan & His Tympany Five	Decca	6

== See also ==
- Billboard year-end top singles of 1947
- Billboard Most-Played Folk Records of 1947
- 1947 in music
