= The Dixie Hummingbirds =

American gospel music group

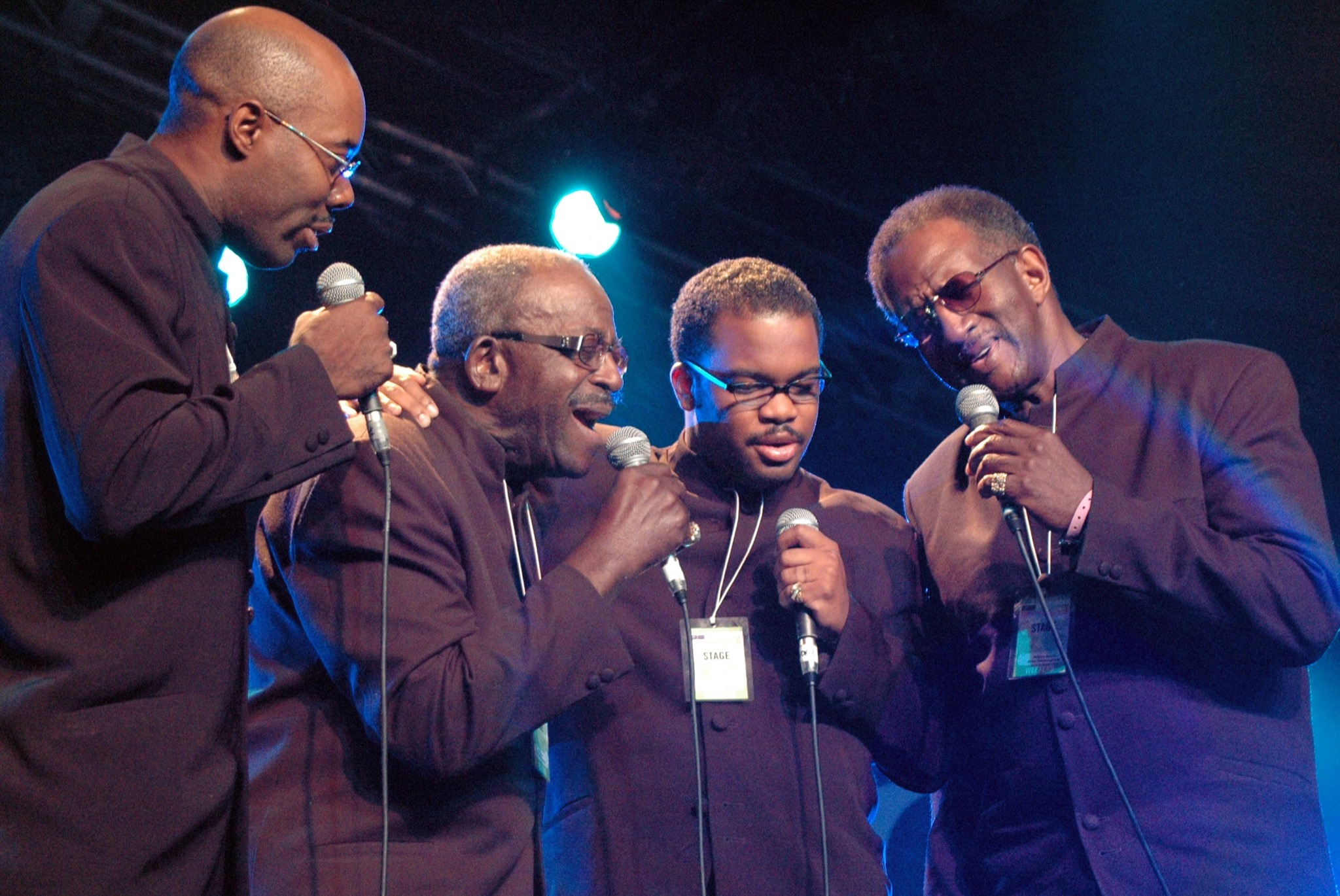
- The Dixie Hummingbirds in 2004

Background information
- Also known as: The Sterling High School Quartet
- Origin: Greenville, South Carolina, U.S.
- Genre: Gospel
- Years active: 1928–present
- Labels: Decca, MCA, Peacock
- Members: Carlton Lewis III; Torrey Nettles; Roy Smith; Troy Smith
- Past members: James B. Davis; Ira Tucker; Barney Parks; Wilson Baker; Jimmy Bryant; William Bobo; Beachy Thompson; Howard Carroll; Paul Owens; Carl Davis; Joe Williams; James Williams; Lyndon Baines Jones; Enoch Webster; Frank Frierson; Abraham Rice; Willie Coleman; Barney Gipson; J.B. Matterson; Claude Jeter; William Henry; William Bright; Ernest James; James Walker; Cornell McKnight; Jimmy Brown

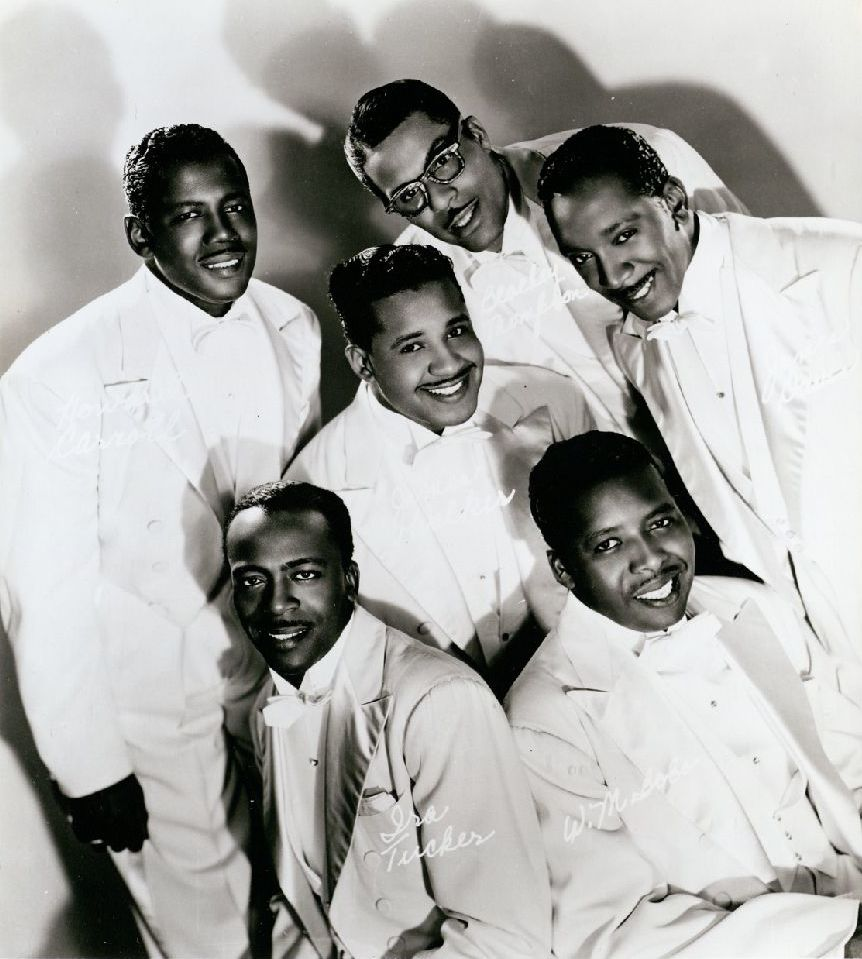
The Dixie Hummingbirds publicity photo from the 1950s or 1960s.

The Dixie Hummingbirds (formerly known as The Sterling High School Quartet) are an American gospel music group, spanning more than 80 years from the jubilee quartet style of the 1920s, through the "hard gospel" quartet style of gospel's golden age in the 1940s and 1950s, to the eclectic pop-tinged songs of today. The Hummingbirds inspired a number of imitators, such as Jackie Wilson and James Brown, who adapted the shouting style and enthusiastic showmanship of hard gospel to secular themes to help create soul music in the 1960s.

== History ==
=== 1928–1938 ===
The group was formed in 1928 in Greenville, South Carolina, by James B. Davis and his classmate Barney Parks under the name the Sterling High School Quartet. After seeing the success of other quartet groups and realizing that there was not much work for African Americans in the South outside of low-paying labor jobs, the quartet decided to leave school and pursue their dream of being professional spiritual entertainers. By making this move, they had to change the name of the group to cut ties with the school. Davis recalls how they changed their name to the Dixie Hummingbirds:

I figured that was the only bird could fly both backwards and forwards. Since that was how our career seemed to be going [laughs], I figure that was a good name, and the guys went along with it

The Hummingbirds traveled around the South singing spirituals. It was not until 1938 when James Bryant (formerly with the Heavenly Gospel Singers) joined the group that they start to sing Gospel. In September 1939 (Davis disputes the year as being 1938) the Hummingbirds drove to New York using contacts that Bryant had to record with Decca Records.

=== 1938–1939 ===
Bryant abruptly left the group after clashing with it following their return from recording in New York. With engagements picking up, they had to find a replacement and soon heard of Ira Tucker, a young singer from nearby Spartanburg, who became lead singer of the group at the age of 13.

Tucker introduced an energetic style of showmanship – running through the aisles, jumping off stage, falling to his knees in prayer – that was copied by many quartets that followed. Tucker also took the lead in the stylistic innovations adopted by the group, combining gospel shouting and subtle melismas with the syncopated delivery made popular by the Golden Gate Quartet, as well as adventuresome harmonies, called "trickeration" by the group, in which another member of the group would pick up a note just as Tucker left it off.

=== 1940–1944 ===
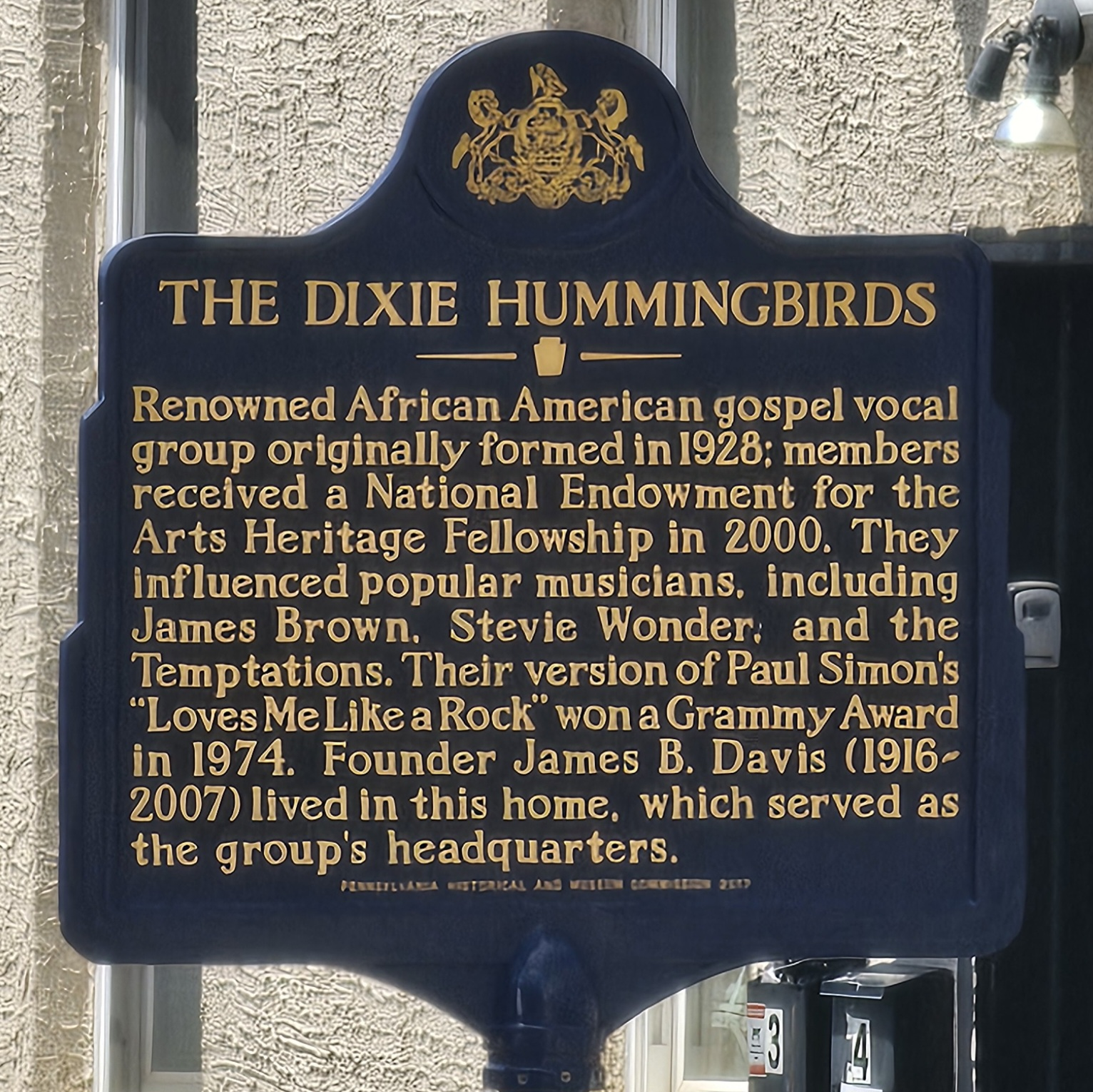
Pennsylvania state historical marker for the group in Philadelphia

As time progressed, the Hummingbirds decided to move up north as part of the Great Migration. The North provided better opportunities and was better in dealing with justice for African Americans. In 1941, the Hummingbirds moved to Washington, D.C., where Davis had an aunt with whom they could stay. The group would eventually go to Philadelphia, where Barney Parks' father lived. Most importantly, they were promised work from Charlie Newsome, a booking agent they had met in Jacksonville, who had been managing a group called the Royal Harmony Singers.

In 1942, the Hummingbirds would make the move north with James Davis, Barney Parks, Ira Tucker, Wilson Baker and William Henry. Charlie Newsome arranged an audition for the Hummingbirds with John Hammond, an unofficial musical director for the Café Society, a black and tan club in New York. Hammond was looking for a gospel act to work in the club. Impressed with the Hummingbirds, they were given the gig. Hammond did not like the "Dixie" in their name. They changed their name so that they would not convey a suggestion of slavery. At that time they were performing under three names: the Dixie Hummingbirds in churches, the Swanee Quintet in Philadelphia, and the Jericho Quintet at the Café Society. While performing at the Café Society, the Hummingbirds were often backed by Lester Young's sextet. William Henry was drafted into the military in 1943, with William Bobo replacing him. Hammond was fond of Henry and ended their contract with Café Society when he left the group.

=== 1945–1951 ===
Ira Tucker was asked to leave the Hummingbirds and join the Golden Gate Quartet. He told Davis, who urged him to try them out, which he did for a day and a half before deciding he could stay no longer. Barney Parks had to leave the group due to being drafted. Before he left, he helped find a replacement, Beachy Thompson of the Willing Four out of Baltimore, who at the time recently opened for the Hummingbirds at their anniversary program. The Hummingbirds signed to Regis Records, which changed its name to Manor Records, owned by Irving Berman, in 1945. In 1946, The Hummingbirds signed a record deal with Apollo Records, a growing New York Based label. Apollo Records also signed Mahalia Jackson.

=== 1952–1959 ===
The Hummingbirds had signed and recorded with Gotham and Okeh Records. They recorded for both labels and did not have any hits from either label. They continued to tour heavily. The Hummingbirds decided that they needed a new label. They went to Texas to sign and record with Peacock Records under Don Robey.

These recordings proved successful and the Hummingbirds were back in the Billboard charts. Around this time, the Hummingbirds asked Howard Carroll to be a part of the group, replacing Paul Owens. Carroll did not do much singing; he preferred to play the guitar.

=== 1960–1976 ===
The group sang the backup vocals on Paul Simon's "Loves Me Like a Rock", and "Tenderness", from his album There Goes Rhymin' Simon. In 1973, Robey sold Peacock to ABC Records, which released a cover of "Loves Me Like a Rock," produced by Walter "Kandor" Kahn and the group's lead vocalist Ira Tucker, which reached No. 72 on Billboard Magazine's Top 100 R&B Singles chart. The single also won a Grammy for "Best Soul Gospel Performance." Kahn and Tucker produced an album for ABC entitled We Love You Like A Rock. The album contained Stevie Wonder's "Jesus Children", on which Wonder played keyboards.

William Bobo died On April 28, 1976 from heart disease.

=== 1977–present ===
James Davis retired In 1984, with Joe Williams (formerly of The Sons Of The Birds) replacing him.

Beachy Thompson died on June 28, 1994.

Guitarist Lyndon Baines Jones joined in 2000.

Carlton Lewis III joined in the 2003, and at some point later, he left only to return to the group when Ira Tucker got ill.

In 2003, the Hummingbirds were the subject of an award-winning book about their 75-year career span, Great God A'Mighty! The Dixie Hummingbirds: Celebrating the Rise of Soul Gospel Music by Jerry Zolten. The book was favorably reviewed in The New York Times on February 26, 2003. In February 2008, the first feature-length documentary/concert film featuring the life and history of the Dixie Hummingbirds was released in commemoration of their 80 years as performers. The Dixie Hummingbirds: Eighty Years Young has been shown on the Gospel Music Channel and has played at numerous film festivals. Produced and directed by award-winning filmmaker Jeff Scheftel, and executive produced by University of Hawaiʻi musicologist Jay Junker, the film is now available on DVD, featuring extensive interviews with Ira Tucker Sr., Abraham Rice, Cornell McKnight, Lyndon Jones, Willie Coleman, Torrey Nettles, and William Bright with archival footage, and following the current group as they perform in numerous venues and rehearse under Mr. Tucker's spirited guidance, in their hometown of Philadelphia, and across the vast landscape of America.

Barney Parks died on February 24, 2007.

Ira Tucker Sr. died due to complications from heart disease on June 24, 2008, at the age of 83. The group continued with the lineup of William Bright, Lyndon Baines Jones, Carlton Lewis III, Torrey Nettles and Cornell McKnight, thereby preserving the legacy left by the original members.

Twin brothers Troy & Roy Smith joined in 2015/2016.

William Bright died on February 4, 2017.

Howard Carroll died on October 17, 2017, at age 92 at an assisted living center in Philadelphia.

Enoch Webster died on November 27, 2020.

Lyndon Baines Jones died on February 17, 2021.

Abraham Rice died on November 26, 2022.

== Awards and honors ==
The Dixie Hummingbirds are recipients of a 2000 National Heritage Fellowship awarded by the National Endowment for the Arts, which is the United States' highest honor in the folk and traditional arts.

=== Grammy history ===
The Dixie Hummingbirds Grammy Awards History
Year	Category	Title	Genre	Label	Result
2007	Best Traditional Gospel Album	Still Keeping It Real	Gospel	MCG	Nominated
2000	Best Traditional Gospel Album	Music In The Air	Gospel	House Of Blues	Nominated
1994	Best Traditional Gospel Album	In Good Health	Gospel	Atlanta International	Nominated
1973	Best Soul Gospel Performance	"Loves Me Like a Rock"	Gospel	MCG	Won

=== Grammy Hall of Fame ===
Recordings inducted into the Grammy Hall of Fame, which is a special Grammy award established in 1973 to honor recordings that are at least twenty-five years old, and that have "qualitative or historical significance".

Grammy Hall of Fame
Year Recorded	Title	Artist	Genre	Label	Year Inducted
1946	"Amazing Grace"	The Dixie Hummingbirds	Gospel (Single)	Apollo	2000

=== Inductions ===
Year Inducted	Title
2007	Christian Music Hall of Fame and Museum
2000	Vocal Group Hall of Fame
