= New Orleans Blues (disambiguation) =

New Orleans Blues may refer to:

- New Orleans blues, a subgenre of blues music
- "New Orleans Blues", the 1925 composition by Jelly Roll Morton (see Spanish Tinge)
- New Orleans Blues (song), a 1947 song by Johnny Moore
- New Orleans rhythm and blues, a genre of music from New Orleans, Louisiana
- Louisiana Blues, an American basketball team
- "Louisiana Blues," a song by Bonnie Raitt and Little Feat
