= Mina for You =

Studio album by Mina
- Released: July 1969
- Genre: Pop
- Length: 36:41
- Label: PDU
- Producer: James Nebb

Mina chronology
I discorsi (1969)	Mina for You (1969)	Incontro con Mina (1969)

Mina for You is a studio album by Italian singer Mina, released in July 1969. The album features songs exclusively in English. All songs that appeared on the album are cover versions in the original language, with the exception of "Can't Help the Way I Am", which is a translation of the Italian song "Un colpo al cuore". The album was arranged by Augusto Martelli, who took the pseudonym Bob Mitchell.

In the second half of 1969, the album reached the fourth position in the weekly album chart. An additional edition of the album was released in September. A remastered version of the album was released on CD in 2001 by EMI.

== Track listing ==
Side A
No.	Title	Writer(s)	Length
1.	"I Won't Cry Anymore"	Al Frisch; Fred Wise	3:02
2.	"No Arms Can Ever Hold You"	Art Crafer; Jimmy Nebb	2:38
3.	"I Should Care"	Axel Stordahl; Paul Weston; Sammy Cahn	3:13
4.	"Lazy River"	Hoagy Carmichael; Sidney Arodin	2:47
5.	"You're Mine, You"	Edward Heyman; Johnny Green	3:38
6.	"Can't Help the Way I Am (Un colpo al cuore)"	Giancarlo Bigazzi; Mario Capuano; Crafer; Nebb	3:11
Total length:			18:29

Side B
No.	Title	Writer(s)	Length
1.	"I Want to Be Loved (But Only by You)"	Savannah Churchill	2:30
2.	"And My Heart Cried"	Crafer; Nebb	3:10
3.	"That Old Feelin'"	Lew Brown; Sammy Fain	3:31
4.	"The Man that Got Away"	Ira Gershwin; Harold Arlen	2:44
5.	"Johnny Guitar"	Peggy Lee; Victor Young	2:39
6.	"I'll Never Be Free"	Bennie Benjamin; George David Weiss	3:38
Total length:			18:12

== Charts ==
Chart performance for Mina for You
Chart (1969)	Peak position
Italian Albums (Musica e dischi)	4
