= Hurry On Down =

Hurry On Down may refer to:

- Hurry On Down (album), a 1988 album by Alastair Galbraith
- Hurry On Down (song), a 1947 song by Nellie Lutcher
