= String Quartet No. 11 =

String Quartet No. 11 may refer to:

- String Quartet No. 11 (Beethoven), Serioso by Ludwig van Beethoven
- String Quartet No. 11 (Dvořák) by Antonín Dvořák
- String Quartet No. 11 (Hill) by Alfred Hill
- String Quartet No. 11 (Maconchy) by Elizabeth Maconchy
- String Quartet No. 11 (Milhaud), Op. 232, by Darius Milhaud
- String Quartet No. 11 (Mozart) by Wolfgang Amadeus Mozart
- String Quartet No. 11 (Schubert) by Franz Schubert
- String Quartet No. 11 (Shostakovich) by Dmitri Shostakovich
- String Quartet No. 11 (Spohr) by Louis Spohr
- String Quartet No. 11 (Villa-Lobos) by Heitor Villa-Lobos
