= Irving Berman =

Irving Berman, was an American businessman, record company owner, and nightclub impresario from Newark, New Jersey.

Berman founded the jazz imprint Regis Records (1943–1946), and then the more successful Manor Records (1945–1949). In 1949 The Four Tunes left Manor and signed with RCA causing Berman to sue for breach of contract. The Musicians Union believed the allegations of non-payment of royalties so Berman lost both the litigation and his artists and furthermore had his licence to record revoked by the union. He then turned up as A&R director for the newly-formed Arco Records (1949 onwards). Many of his artist stable turned up there too. Savannah Churchill was his most successful artist on Manor,(he also fulfilled the role as her personal manager) with two hit singles. Other Manor artists included The Dixie Hummingbirds and Sister Ernestine Washington.
