= Campanas Quintana collection =

- Colección de Campanas Quintana
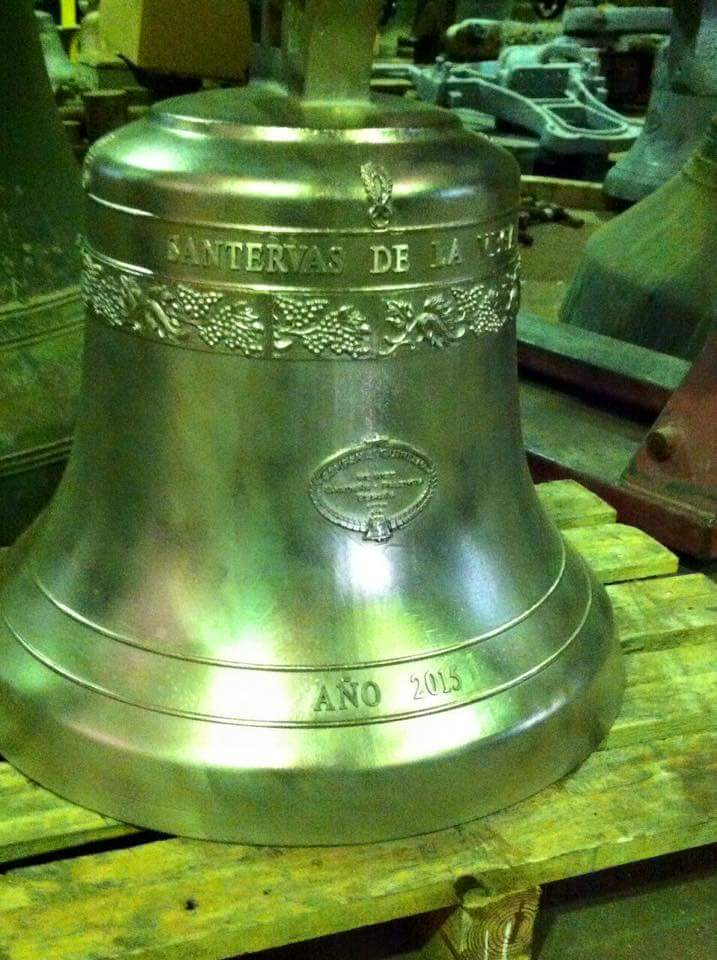
- A bell in the collection
- Established: March 1991
- Type: Bell museum
- Owner: Valladolid Provincial Council
- Website: www.funjdiaz.net/campanas.php

The Campanas Quintana collection is a museum in Urueña, a municipality located in the Province of Valladolid. The collection was donated by the founder Manuel Quintana Saguillo, a native of Saldaña (Palencia) and contains a score of bells of different types and sizes. The pieces of the collection are arranged chronologically from the 15th century to the 20th century. It is part of a larger collection held by the Joaquín Díaz Foundation, named for the Spanish folklorist Joaquín Díaz González.

== Hours ==
The museum of Quintana bells opens its doors Tuesdays through Sundays from 10:00am to 1:00pm, and Tuesdays to Fridays from 4:00pm to 7:00pm.

It is closed on Mondays and holidays.
