= Joe Lutcher =

American R&B saxophonist and bandleader (1919–2006)

- Born: Joseph Woodman Lutcher; 23 December 1919; Lake Charles, Louisiana; United States
- Died: 29 October 2006 (aged 86) Los Angeles, California
- Genres: R&B, jump blues, gospel
- Occupations: Bandleader, saxophonist, songwriter
- Instruments: Alto saxophone, vocals
- Years active: 1945–1953
- Labels: Specialty, Capitol, Modern, Jordan

Joseph Woodman Lutcher (23 December 1919 – 29 October 2006) was an American R&B saxophonist and bandleader, the younger brother of singer Nellie Lutcher. He performed and recorded successfully in the 1940s, but later abandoned a commercial musical career and became an outspoken member of the Seventh-day Adventist Church.

== Early life and musical career ==
He was born in Lake Charles, Louisiana, one of ten surviving children (out of 15) of Isaac and Susie Lutcher. Isaac and his children formed a small band, in which Joe played saxophone. By 1941, he had moved to Los Angeles, California, joining his sister Nellie who had relocated there in the mid-1930s. He was drafted into the US Navy in 1942, leaving in 1945 and returning to Los Angeles.

He led the house band at the Look Café in Los Angeles, before relocating to the more prestigious Café Society, where his band were renamed The Society Cats. He also worked as a bandleader for Nat King Cole, Sammy Davis Jr. and the Mills Brothers. In 1947 he was heard by Art Rupe, who signed him to his new record label, Specialty. However, Lutcher was unhappy with Rupe's request that he only record slow blues, and at the behest of his sister Nellie also recorded (as "Joe Lutcher's Jump Band") for Capitol Records. Joe Lutcher's first hit was "Shuffle Woogie" on the Capitol label, which reached # 10 on the Billboard "Race Records" chart in March 1948. "Rockin' Boogie", on Specialty, reached # 14 in September 1948. Besides Lutcher on alto saxophone and occasional vocals, members of his band included Karl George on trumpet, Bill Ellis and Leon Beck on saxes, Harold Morrow on piano, Bill Cooper on bass and novelty vocals, and drummer Dick "Booker" Hart, sometimes augmented with vocals by actor Cliff Holland. It has been written of Lutcher that many of his recordings "have unusually moody, complex and sometime humorous arrangements that are reminiscent of Frank Zappa's later recordings."

In 1949 he signed with Modern Records, where he recorded his own composition, "Mardi Gras". Lutcher's version reached # 13 on the R&B chart, but the tune became better known in later modified versions by Professor Longhair and Fats Domino. He later recorded for Peacock Records in Houston, Texas, and for several smaller labels, but with diminishing success.

== Later life ==
In 1953, Lutcher joined the Seventh-day Adventist Church in Los Angeles, and abandoned the music business, refusing to pay musicians' union dues because Church tenets prohibited union membership. In 1957, he discussed religious matters with Little Richard, following which, during a tour of Australia, Little Richard resolved also to give up playing what was described as "the devil's music". Lutcher joined Penniman in Bible studies, and they toured the country together as The Little Richard Evangelistic Team, preaching the word of God to reportedly enthusiastic crowds.

Lutcher later set up a gospel record shop and a record label, Jordan Records, which released recordings by himself and by The Gospelaires and The Jordan Gospel Singers. In 1974, he agreed to lead the Watts Community Symphony Orchestra in a series of concerts, bringing him into legal conflict with the musicians' union. In later years he refused all requests to discuss his earlier secular music career.

== Death ==
He died in Los Angeles in 2006, aged 86.
