= Incontro con Mina =

Compilation album by Mina
- Released: 1969
- Length: 49:30
- Label: PDU

Mina chronology
Mina for You (1969)	Incontro con Mina (1969)	Bugiardo più che mai...più incosciente che mai... (1969)

Incontro con Mina is a compilation album by Italian singer Mina, issued in 1969.

The album was composed of songs taken from the previous albums Dedicato a mio padre (1967), Canzonissima '68 (1968) and I discorsi (1969).

== Track listing ==
No.	Title	Writer(s)	Length
1.	"Io innamorata"	Giorgio Calabrese, Augusto Martelli	2:59
2.	"Vorrei che fosse amore"	Antonio Amurri, Bruno Canfora	2:31
3.	"Un colpo al cuore"	Giancarlo Bigazzi, Mario Capuano	3:19
4.	"La voce del silenzio"	Mogol, Paolo Limiti, Elio Isola	3:23
5.	"E sono ancora qui"	Antonio Amurri, Bruno Canfora	2:29
6.	"I discorsi"	Augusto Martelli, Mina	3:05
7.	"Fantasia (Fantasy)"	Geoff Stephens, Giorgio Calabrese	3:03
8.	"Sacumdì, sacumdà (Nem vem que não tem)"	Carlos Imperial, Paolo Limiti	2:37
9.	"Il cielo in una stanza (Acoustic version)"	Gino Paoli, Mogol	2:29
10.	"Se stasera sono qui"	Luigi Tenco, Mogol	3:59
11.	"Silenzioso slow"	Giovanni D'Anzi, Alfredo Bracchi	2:57
12.	"Canzone per te"	Sergio Endrigo, Sergio Bardotti	3:38
Total length:			36:29
