= He's a Real Gone Guy =

Single by Nellie Lutcher and Her Rhythm
- Released: 1947
- Recorded: April 30, 1947
- Length: 3:02
- Label: Capitol Americana 40017
- Songwriter(s): Nellie Lutcher

"He's a Real Gone Guy" is a song written and sung by Nellie Lutcher with backing on the record by a group called "Her Rhythm". Lutcher also played the piano on the record which was released in July 1947 on the Capitol Americana label (catalog no. 40017). It debuted on the Billboard magazine's race records chart on September 27, 1947, peaked at No. 2, and remained on the chart for 23 weeks. It was ranked No. 9 on the magazine's year-end list of the most played race records of 1947.

== See also ==
- Billboard Most-Played Race Records of 1947
