= Jack, You're Dead =

Single by Louis Jordan and his Tympany Five
- Released: 1947
- Recorded: October 10, 1946
- Genre: Jump blues
- Length: 2:43
- Label: Decca
- Songwriters: Dick Miles, Walter Bishop

"Jack, You're Dead" is a song written by Dick Miles and Walter Bishop. It was performed by Louis Jordan and his Tympany Five, recorded in October 1946, and released on the Decca label (catalog no. 23901-B). The song describes a man's physical state if he fails to respond to romance.

The song peaked at No. 1 on Billboard's race record chart and remained on the chart for 20 weeks. It also reached No. 21 on the pop chart. It was ranked No. 4 on the magazine's list of the most played race records of 1947.

Jordan plays alto saxophone and sings on the record. The "A" side of the record was "I Know What You're Puttin' Down". On its release, Billboard described the song as "dandy", "jivey", and "solid".

Jordan and the Tympany Five also performed the song in the 1947 motion picture, "Look-Out Sister".

== See also ==
- Billboard Most-Played Race Records of 1947
