= Hurry On Down (song) =

"Hurry on Down"

Single by Nellie Lutcher and Her Rhythm
- Released: 1947
- Recorded: April 10, 1947
- Length: 2:24
- Label: Capitol Americana 40002
- Songwriter(s): Nellie Lutcher

"Hurry on Down" is a song written and sung by Nellie Lutcher with backing on the record by a group called "Her Rhythm". Lutcher also played the piano on the record which was released in 1947 on the Capitol Americana label (catalog no. 40002). It debuted on the Billboard magazine's race records chart on August 16, 1947, peaked at No. 2, and remained on the chart for 18 weeks. It was ranked No. 10 on the magazine's year-end list of the most played race records of 1947.

== See also ==
- Billboard Most-Played Race Records of 1947
