= Texas and Pacific (song) =

Single by Louis Jordan and his Tympany Five
- Released: 1947
- Recorded: October 10, 1946
- Genre: Jump blues
- Length: 3:12
- Label: Decca 23810
- Songwriter(s): Jack Wolf Fine, Joseph E. Hirsch

"Texas and Pacific" is a song written by Jack Wolf Fine and Joseph E. Hirsch. It was performed by Louis Jordan and his Tympany Five, recorded in October 1946, and released on the Decca label (catalog no. 23810-A). The song describes a rider's experience on the Texas & Pacific Railway. The "B" side of the record was "I Like 'Em Fat Like That".

The song peaked at No. 1 on Billboard's race record chart and remained on the chart for 15 weeks. It also reached No. 20 on the pop chart. It was ranked No. 8 on the magazine's list of the most played race records of 1947.

Jordan and the Tympany Five also performed the song in the 1947 motion picture, Reet, Petite, and Gone.

== See also ==
- Billboard Most-Played Race Records of 1947
- List of train songs
