= Joaquín Díaz González =

Spanish ethnomusicologist and folklorist

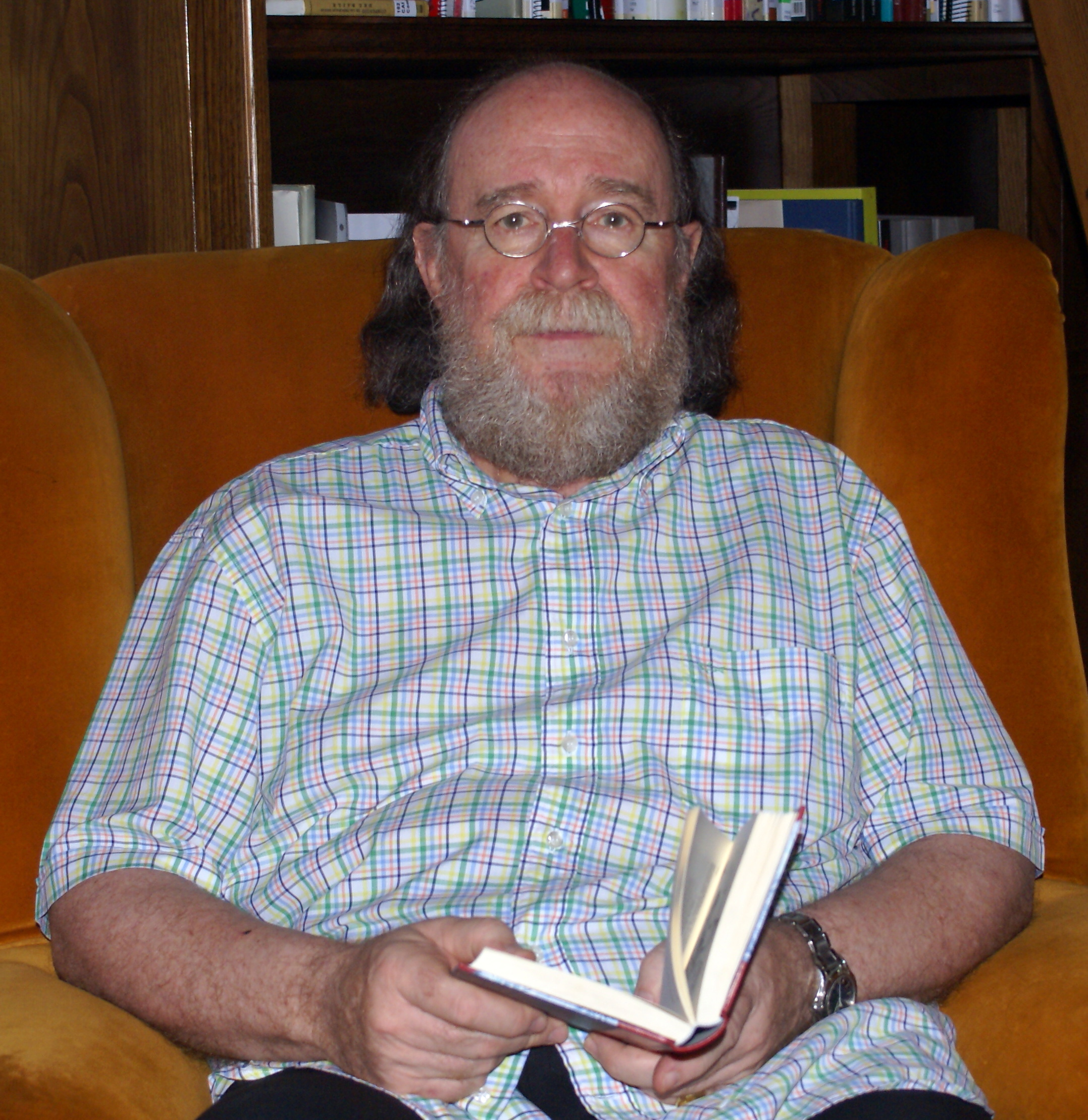
Joaquin Diaz González

Joaquin Diaz González (born May 14, 1947, Zamora) is a Spanish ethnomusicologist, folklorist, singer, and multi-instrumentalist. He is known for his work researching and collecting Spanish folk songs and folk lore, and for his extensive recording and performing of this literature as a musician. In 1980 he founded the monthly journal Revista de folklore and created the Centro Castellano de Estudios Folklóricos at the University of Valladolid where he is a professor. He was elected a member of the Real Academia de Bellas Artes de la Purísima Concepción in 1982, and served as the vice president of the Sociedad Ibérica de Etnomusicología in 1993–1994. The New Grove Dictionary of Music and Musicians describes Diaz González as having a "prominent place as a Spanish folklorist".
