= Boogie Woogie Blue Plate =

Single by Louis Jordan and his Tympany Five
- Released: August 1947
- Recorded: April 23, 1947
- Genre: Boogie woogie
- Length: 2:52
- Label: Decca 24104
- Songwriter(s): Joe Burhkin, Johnny DeVries

"Boogie Woogie Blue Plate" is a song written by Joe Burhkin and Johnny DeVries. It was performed by Louis Jordan and his Tympany Five and released on the Decca label (catalog no. 24104-A).

The song's lyrics describe an attractive waitress who conveys orders to the kitchen for various orders, including a "boogie woogie blue plate".

The song peaked at No. 1 on Billboard's race record chart and remained on the chart for 24 weeks. It also reached No. 21 on the pop chart. It was ranked No. 2 on the magazine's list of the most played race records of 1947.

== See also ==
- Billboard Most-Played Race Records of 1947
