= New Orleans Blues (song) =

Single by Johnny Moore's Three Blazers
- Released: 1947
- Label: Exclusive
- Songwriter: Leon René

"New Orleans Blues" is a song written by Leon René and performed by Johnny Moore's Three Blazers, consisting of Charles Brown on vocals and piano, Johnny Moore on guitar, and Eddie Williams on bass. The record which was released in 1947 on the Exclusive label (catalog no. 240). It debuted on Billboard magazine's race records chart on June 28, 1947, peaked at No. 2, and remained on the chart for 13 weeks. It was ranked No. 11 on the Billboard's year-end list of the most played race records of 1947.
