= I Want to Be Loved (But Only by You) =

Single by Savannah Churchill and the Sentimentalists (aka The Four Tunes)
- Released: February 1947
- Label: Manor 1046
- Songwriter: Savannah Churchill

"I Want To Be Loved (But Only By You)" is a 1947 ballad written by and recorded by Savannah Churchill and The Sentimentalists. The single was Savannah Churchill's most successful release on the R&B charts, spending six months on the chart and reaching number one on the R&B Juke Box chart.

== Cover versions ==
- Also in 1947, Lionel Hampton and His Hamptonians, reached number two on the R&B Juke Box chart, with their version of the song.
- Also in 1947, Dinah Washington recorded the song. It was released as a single Stairway to the Stars c/w I Want to be Loved. It is often confused with her 1950 single I Wanna Be Loved (written by Johnny Green, Edward Heyman and Billy Rose.)
- In 1956 Johnnie Ray recorded a version for Columbia Records.
- In 1969 Mina covered the song on her album Mina for You.
- In 1969 Lou Rawls also covered it for his album The Way It Way Was, The Way It Is.

== See also ==
- Billboard Most-Played Race Records of 1947
- List of Billboard number-one R&B singles of the 1940s
