= The Four Tunes =

American vocal group

The Four Tunes (also referred to as The 4 Tunes) were a leading black pop vocal quartet during the 1950s. The members at the peak of their fame were Pat Best, Jimmy Gordon, Jimmie Nabbie, and Danny Owens.

== Career ==
The group originated from The Brown Dots, a quartet started in New York City by Ivory "Deek" Watson (born July 18, 1909, Mounds, Illinois – died November 4, 1969, Washington, DC) after he split from the Ink Spots in late 1944. The other original members were William Henry "Pat" Best (baritone and guitar) (born June 6, 1923, Wilmington, North Carolina – died October 14, 2004, Roseville, California), Joe King (tenor), and Jimmy Gordon (bass).

Best and Watson were co-credited with the song "For Sentimental Reasons", which became The Brown Dots' first single. Later it became a 1946 hit for Nat King Cole and was recorded by many other artists. Soon afterwards, King was replaced by Jimmie Nabbie (tenor) and, in late 1946, Nabbie, Best, and Gordon recruited Danny Owens to replace Watson. They called themselves The Sentimentalists (after "For Sentimental Reasons") and started recording for Manor, backing Savannah Churchill on her 1947 No. 1 US Billboard R&B chart hit, "I Want to Be Loved (But Only by You)", and also on her 1948 releases "Time Out for Tears" and "I Want to Cry".

After bandleader Tommy Dorsey asked them to stop calling themselves the Sentimentalists, also the name of his vocal group, they changed their name to The Four Tunes. Nabbie later stated that the name was derived from the fact that all they had left were four tunes that they had not yet recorded. Manor reissued all their Sentimentalists recordings as by the Four Tunes.

They continued recording for Manor until early in 1949, when they switched over to RCA Victor, where they had 18 records released between May 1949 and November 1953. They then switched to Jerry Blaine's Jubilee label, where they achieved their greatest popularity. Their first Jubilee recording, "Marie" was released in September, and reached No. 2 on the Billboard R&B chart (No. 13 Pop). It sold one million copies. This Irving Berlin tune had been a No. 1 hit for Tommy Dorsey (with Jack Leonard on vocal) in 1937, and was later a hit for Irish group The Bachelors.

The Four Tunes' next Jubilee release, "I Understand (Just How You Feel)" was a bigger hit, climbing to No. 7 R&B, and No. 6 on the pop chart. It sold over one million copies, and was awarded a gold disc. By this time, the group which had leaned closer to rhythm & blues, had begun to develop more of a pop style of sound. The group played the black theater circuit and also many white clubs. When they were on a tour with pop singer Joni James, she asked Jimmie Nabbie to write a song for her. The result, "You Are My Love", was her big hit of 1955 (which the Four Tunes covered). In late 1959, there were two releases on Crosby (a Las Vegas label that Jimmie Nabbie partly owned). Then, there was a single release on Robin's Nest (as the "Four Tunes And One") in 1962.

After 18 years with the group, Nabbie left in 1963, to become a soloist (in 1965, he joined an Ink Spots group to come full circle; he would remain with them until his death); Danny Owens left about the same time. Billy Wells was tapped to fill Nabbie's place and tenor Gaines Steele was brought in to replace Owens. In the mid 1960s, Frank Dawes (tenor and piano) was also brought on board, as a utility singer. The recording career of the 4 Tunes wound down with an LP on the ARA label in 1969 (which contained versions of "I Love You For Sentimental Reasons," but also "Whole Lot Of Shaking Going On"). The personnel were: Pat Best, Jimmy Gordon, Billy Wells, Frank Dawes, and Chuck Hampton (drums and vocals).

The group kept going throughout subsequent decades, although Wells left in the 1980s for medical reasons and was replaced by Andre Williams, who in turn made way for Rufus McKay. Pat Best and Jimmy Gordon finally wound the group up in the late 1990s.

Jimmie Nabbie died after double bypass surgery on September 15, 1992, and Pat Best died on October 14, 2004, at the age of 81.

== Awards and recognition ==
The Four Tunes were inducted into The Vocal Group Hall of Fame in 2004.
