= String Quartet No. 11 (Villa-Lobos) =

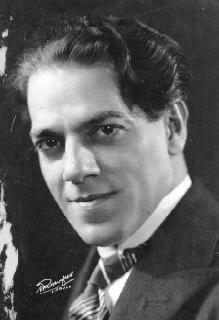
Heitor Villa-Lobos

String Quartet No. 11 is a 1947 string quartet, part of a 17-work series in the medium by Brazilian composer Heitor Villa-Lobos.

Villa-Lobos composed his Eleventh Quartet in Rio de Janeiro in 1947. It was first performed by the Quarteto Iacovino in Rio de Janeiro in 1953. The score is dedicated to Mindinha (Arminda Neves d'Almeida), the composer's companion for the last 23 years of his life.

A typical performance lasts approximately 27 minutes.

== Analysis ==
The quartet consists of the traditional four movements:

1. Allegro non troppo
2. Scherzo (Vivace)
3. Adagio – Andante – Adagio
4. Poco andantino (quasi allegro)

Although it follows the Tenth Quartet by only a year, the Eleventh represents a distinct stylistic leap over its immediate predecessor. It is decidedly less nationalistic than the earlier quartets and is seen as the emergence of a more international style characteristic of the composer's later quartets, which finds its fullest expression in the String Quartet No. 17.

The first movement is dominated by a variety of triplet rhythms.

== Discography ==
Chronological, by date of recording.

- Villa-Lobos Concurso Internacional de Quarteto de Cordas, 1966. Quartet No. 11 (Quarteto Mario Andrade), Quartet No. 16 (Quarteto Rio de Janeiro). Recorded live at Sala Cecília Meireles, Rio de Janeiro. LP recording, 1 disc: 12 in., 33⅓ rpm, stereo. Museu Villa-Lobos MEC/DAC/MVL-013. Disco é cultura. Rio de Janeiro: Tapecar Gravações, 1975.
- Heitor Villa-Lobos: String Quartets Nos. 11, 16 and 17. Danubius Quartet (Judit Tóth and Adél Miklós, violins; Cecilia Bodolai, viola; Ilona Wibli, cello). Recorded at the Hungaroton Studios in Budapest, 15–16 October 1990, 28–30 January, and 11–15 February 1991. CD recording, 1 disc: digital, 12 cm, stereo. Marco Polo 8.223390. A co-production with Records International. Germany: HH International, Ltd., 1992.
- Heitor Villa-Lobos: Quartetos de cordas 7, 8, 9, 10, 11. Quarteto Amazônia. CD recording, 2 discs: digital, 12 cm, stereo. Barcelona: Discmedi D.L., 2000.
  - Also issued as part of Villa-Lobos: Os 17 quartetos de cordas / The 17 String Quartets. Quarteto Bessler-Reis and Quarteto Amazônia. CD recording, 6 sound discs: digital, 12 cm, stereo. Kuarup Discos KCX-1001 (KCD 045, M-KCD-034, KCD 080/1, KCD-051, KCD 042). Rio de Janeiro: Kuarup Discos, 1996.
- Villa-Lobos: String Quartets, Volume 6. Quartets Nos. 4, 9, 11. Cuarteto Latinoamericano (Saúl Bitrán, Arón Bitrán, violins; Javier Montiel, viola; Alvaro Bitrán, cello). Recorded at the Sala Blas Galindo of the Centro Nacional de las Artes in Mexico City, 31 July – 3 August 2000. Music of Latin American Masters. CD recording, 1 disc: digital, 12 cm, stereo. Dorian DOR-93229. Troy, NY: Dorian Recordings, 2001.
  - Reissued as part of Heitor Villa-Lobos: The Complete String Quartets. 6 CDs + 1 DVD with a performance of Quartet No. 1 and interview with the Cuarteto Latinoamericano. Dorian Sono Luminus. DSL-90904. Winchester, VA: Sono Luminus, 2009.
  - Also reissued (without the DVD) on Brilliant Classics 6634.

== Filmography ==
- Villa-Lobos: A integral dos quartetos de cordas. Quarteto Radamés Gnattali (Carla Rincón, Francisco Roa, violins; Fernando Thebaldi, viola; Hugo Pilger, cello); presented by Turibio Santos. Recorded from June 2010 to September 2011 at the Palácio do Catete, Palácio das Laranjeiras, and the Theatro Municipal, Rio de Janeiro. DVD and Blu-ray (VIBD11111), 3 discs. Rio de Janeiro: Visom Digital, 2012.
