= Julia Lee (musician) =

American blues singer (1902–1958)

Background information
- Born: October 31, 1902; Boonville, Missouri, United States
- Died: December 8, 1958 (aged 56) Kansas City, Missouri, United States
- Genres: Blues, dirty blues
- Occupations: Singer, pianist
- Instruments: Vocals, piano
- Label: Capitol Records

Julia Lee (October 31, 1902 – December 8, 1958) was an American blues and dirty blues musician. Her most commercially successful number was the US Billboard R&B chart topping hit "(Opportunity Knocks But Once) Snatch and Grab It" in 1947. She is best known for her trademark double entendre songs.

== Biography ==
Julia Lee was born in Boonville, Missouri into a family of musicians: her father George E. Lee, Sr. was a violinist and a leader of a string band, and her older brother, George, Jr., was a saxophone player and a singer. Lee was raised in Kansas City (her death certificate also lists it as a place of birth). There is also a confusion with the year of birth: most sources state that Julia was born in 1902, while her gravestone indicates 1903, so does also the death certificate.

=== Education ===
Lee attended Attucks Elementary School, and Lincoln High (graduated in 1917). Her initial musical training occurred in the family; she obtained her piano at the age of 10 and had gifted ragtime pianists including Charlie Watts and Scrap Harris as her tutors. Lee continued her education with formal music studies at the Western University, a historically black college in Quindaro, Kansas.

=== Musical career ===
While studying, still in her early teens, Lee was a vocalist with a local band. (Walter Page was playing the string bass there). She started a 15-year period of working together with her brother, George E. Lee, Jr., in 1918, when they had formed a trio (with a hired drummer) upon George's discharge from the Army (where he played the piano and saxophone in a band). As a young child, she had also performed with her father's string trio at local events. During her early career, she booked her first professional gigs playing ragtime accompaniments for silent movies in local theaters.

In the 1920s, George formed his Novelty Singing Orchestra, the second most prominent band in Kansas City (after Bennie Moten's). The band, whose name possibly reflected the Novelty Club it was playing at, not the genre, was active through the early 1930s, when Charlie Parker did a brief stint there. Lee was singing and playing piano in this orchestra. Julia's first known recording is with the Meritt Records label in 1927, where she played piano in George's orchestra. (It is possible that two records of Julia were made in 1923 in Chicago by OKeh, but never released.) This recording did nothing to advance Julia's career. Her first success came with a November 1929 recording at Brunswick Records with Jesse Stone as pianist and arranger for the Novelty Singing Orchestra. Julia sang "He's Tall Dark and Handsome" and "Won't You Come Over to My House" in her sexy, coquettish voice and played piano with flamboyancy. Even in these early recordings, her delivery of risqué lyrics was considered "jaunty" and "frisky," often featuring double entendres. George briefly merged his band with Moten's in 1932 (Julia at this time shared the piano duties with Count Basie), but re-formed it on its own in 1933, with Julia and George parting ways soon thereafter.

In 1934, during the Great Depression, Lee started performing at Milton's Tap Room, a then-new white nightclub, and stayed there until 1950. She had become averse to touring after a major car crash in 1930. Following a gig in Topeka, the band was returning to Kansas City in a convertible driven by Lee's second husband. The car was speeding, flipped over, and landed in a ditch; Lee was thrown to the back seat and pinned underneath the vehicle while the engine continued to run. A bandmate, "Tweedy," was killed in the accident. Consequently, she remained largely in Kansas City, securing a steady residency at Milton's. She built a strong rapport with patrons, who would often approach her piano to share their worries, to which she responded with magnetic warmth and blues numbers.

Despite her popularity, Lee faced censorship challenges. In the 1940s, agents from the liquor control department raided Milton's Tap Room and banned Lee from singing in Kansas City clubs, citing the "type of song she sang and the way she sang it." The specific offending songs listed were "The Fuller Brush Man" and "Two Old Maids in a Bathtub." Lee sang folksy but bawdy tunes from a songbook titled Songs My Father Taught Me Not to Sing. The ban did not stick, largely due to the intervention of her influential fans, including local bankers, lawyers, and editors.

Dave Dexter Jr., who became familiar with Lee's talent while living in Kansas City, joined Capitol Records soon after its inception in 1942, and on November 1, 1944, supervised the first Lee's record with this label at Vic Damon's studio in Kansas City (Lee sang the remakes of "Come On Over to My House" and "Trouble in Mind"). The Capitol recordings did not catch on initially, and Lee moved on to H. S. (Bert) Somson's short-lived Premier label with a few songs, the most notable being the "Lotus Blossom" (also known as "Marijuana").

In mid 1946, Lee's Capitol recordings of 1944 became popular among the DJs, so in August Dexter signed her for Capitol and brought her to Hollywood (on the way she and her drummer Samuel "Baby" Lovett wrote "Gotta Gimme Whatcha Got") for the first Capital recording credited to 'Julia Lee and Her Boy Friends'. The session musicians included, at different times, the "top-flight" talent: Jay McShann, Vic Dickenson, Benny Carter, Red Norvo, Nappy Lamare, Red Nichols, and Jack Marshall. Many of her singles were distributed to radio stations with explicit warnings that the lyrics were "too blue for airing."

The November 1947 recording session at Capitol generated new popularity with hits such as "King Size Papa" (No. 1 R&B for nine weeks, 1948) and "I Didn't Like It the First Time (The Spinach Song)," which was a "veiled ode to marijuana." (This is when Lee's manager, Johnny Tumino, booked her for gigs in New York and Los Angeles.) Lee sang "King Size Papa" at a White House Correspondents' Association dinner on March 5, 1949, before President Truman.

At Christmas-time 1948, Capitol released "Christmas Spirits" (with its holiday depression theme and risqué "Santa ... I could go for your long [pause] whiskers." The song peaked at number 16 in the R&B chart in January 1949). Lee's last hit was "You Ain't Got It No More" (number 9 in November 1949), subsequent recording sessions that lasted into early 1950s failed to achieve success or show development. "Julia remained a hometown girl." There are multiple explanations of this, from criminal connections of Milton Morris causing lack of out-of-town performances, to Lee's dislike of travel (she once said that she could only travel if she "can keep one foot on the ground"), to her being just a consistently good singer, bound to eventually start repeating herself, to lack of desire to go the distance (she once stated "If you are not happy, there is no percentage in the big money"). Dexter said that if Lee were able to get on records sooner, she would have turned into one of the most popular American singers (Dexter produced both Nat King Cole and Frank Sinatra): "How much more effective might she have been had she recorded as a young woman."

Lee's last recording session with Capitol yielded "Goin' to Chicago Blues" (1952). Later records were with smaller labels: Damon Records (two singles, with more material possibly lost after Vic Damon's death), and Foremost in 1957.

Lee continued to sing (in Cuban Room in Kansas City), and, in 1955, made an appearance in The Delinquents, a film by then little-known Robert Altman.

=== Personal life ===
Lee married Frank Duncan, a star catcher and manager of the Negro National League's Kansas City Monarchs, also a native of Kansas City, in 1919. Lee frequently performed in all-white nightclubs, and Duncan had to sit with the orchestra, pretending to be a musician, in order to see her performing there. The marriage lasted for nine years; their only son, pitcher Frank Duncan III, played alongside his father in 1941, and they are believed to have been the first father-son battery in professional baseball history.

After a divorce from Duncan, Lee married Johnny Thomas around 1927. This marriage lasted two years. It was her second husband who was driving the car during the serious accident in 1930 that killed a band member and left Lee pinned under the vehicle. Lee reportedly married and divorced two more times; she had a string of boyfriends who were "purportedly too eager to take her money," informing the lyrics of her song "Baby I Love You."

According to Dave Dexter Jr., he coined the name for Lee's band, 'Her Boy Friends', after a succession of men in her life that won her affections and took her money.

=== Death ===
Julia Lee died in her home in Kansas City during an afternoon nap, on December 8, 1958, at the age of 56, from a heart attack. She died in her apartment on East Twenty-Eighth Street after playing her standing gig at the Hi Lounge. Her death did not attract much attention, being somewhat eclipsed by the deaths of Tommy Dorsey and Art Tatum.

== Records ==
Lee is best known for her trademark double entendre songs, or, as she once said, "the songs my mother taught me not to sing".

=== 1929 ===
Brunswick Records with George Lee' Novelty Singling Orchestra (recorded in November 1929, re-released in 1930 with Julia's name):

- "He's Tall, Dark and Handsome"
- "Won't You Come Over to My House"

=== 1944 ===
Capitol Records (November 1):

- "Come on Over To My House"
- "Trouble in Mind"

=== 1945 ===
Premier Records:

- "Lotus Blossom"

=== 1946 ===
Capitol Records (August):

- "Gotta Gimme Whatcha Got" (number 3 R&B in 1946)
- "Lies"
- "When a Woman Loves a Man"
- "Have You Ever Been Lonely"
- "Oh! Marie"
- "I'll Get Along Somehow" (number 5 R&B in May 1947)
- "(Opportunity Knocks But Once) Snatch and Grab It" (number 1 R&B in 1947)

=== 1947 ===
Capitol Records (November):

- "Charmaine"
- "I'm Forever Blowing Bubbles"
- "Pagan Love Song"
- "King Size Papa"
- "Take It or Leave It"
- "That's What I Like"
- "I Didn't Like It the First Time"
- "Tell Me Daddy"

=== 1948 ===
Capitol Records:

- "Christmas Spirits" (number 16 R&B in January 1949)

=== 1949 ===
Capitol Records:

- "Tonight's the Night"
- "My Man Stands Out"
- "Do You Want It?"
- "Don't Come Too Soon" (Billboard's reaction: "Lyrics is certainly too blue for airing, and juke ops ... should listen carefully before installing")
- "Don't Save It Too Long"
- "It Comes in Like a Lion (and It Goes Out Like a Lamb)" (Capitol decided not to release it)
- "You Ain't Got It No More" (number 9 R&B in November 1949)

=== 1952 ===
Capitol Records:

- "Going To Chicago Blues"
- "Last Call For Alcohol"

=== 1953 ===
Damon Records:

- "Scat You Cats"
- "I Can't See How"

=== 1957 ===
Foremost Records:

- "Bop and Rock Lullaby"
- "King Size Papa"
- "Saturday Night"

== Sources ==
- Driggs, Frank; Haddix, Chuck (2006). Kansas City Jazz: From Ragtime to Bebop : a History (PDF). Oxford University Press. ISBN 978-0-19-530712-2. OCLC 1028425570.
- Foster, Robin (1 November 2024). "On Going Solo: Mary Lou Williams and Julia Lee at the Crossroads, Kansas City". Grit and Ghosts: Following the Trail of Eight Tenacious Women across a Century. Lincoln: Bison Books. pp. 177–202. ISBN 978-1-4962-3846-7.
- Millar, Bill (1999). "Kansas City Stars. Part 1. Julia Lee". In Colin Escott (ed.). All Roots Lead to Rock: Legends of Early Rock 'n' Roll. Schirmer Books. pp. 27–42. ISBN 978-0-02-864866-8. OCLC 1022595608.
