= Manor Records =

American record label (1940s–1950s)

Manor Records was a jazz record label founded in the mid 1940s. Manor was run Irving Berman, who also owned Regis Records. Its catalogue included Dizzy Gillespie, Coleman Hawkins, Tiny Bradshaw, Paul Bascomb, Sid Catlett, Jimmie Lunceford, and the International Sweethearts of Rhythm.

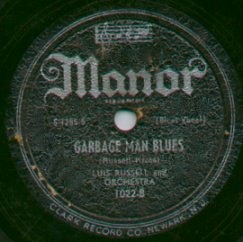

Manor Records moved its headquarters to New Jersey. The label featured such artists on its roster as Savannah Churchill, The Sentimentalists—later famous as The Four Tunes, Luis Russell, Deek Watson and His Brown Dots, Boy Green, Skoodle-Dum-Doo (Seth Richard) and Sheffield, as well as a number of other artists.

Berman later changed the name to ARCO Records. But after 1950, tastes in the record buying public began to change and the hits were very few...consequently Berman shut down operations, and his stars went to other labels. The quality of Manor pressings was not very good, but one could probably attribute that to the war time shellac shortage, which adversely affected even the major labels during World War II.

== See also ==
- List of record labels
