= (Opportunity Knocks But Once) Snatch and Grab It =

1947 novelty song by Julia Lee and her Boy Friends

Single by Julia Lee and Her Boy Friends
- Released: 1947
- Recorded: 1947
- Genre: Novelty; R&B
- Label: Capitol
- Songwriter: Sharon A. Pease
- Producer: Dave Dexter Jr.

"(Opportunity Knocks But Once) Snatch and Grab It" is a song written in 1946 by Sharon A. Pease, a Chicago pianist and a columnist at DownBeat. The song was recorded for Capitol Records by Julia Lee and Her Boy Friends. In 1947 the single was number one on the US Billboard R&B chart for twelve weeks and spent seven months on the chart.

Producer Dave Dexter Jr. brought Julia Lee to Capitol Records expecting her to appeal to both black and white audiences. "Snatch and Grab It" was the first hit confirming Lee's talent. The song material at the time was considered too risqué for the radio, so its chart results (and the ones of the Lee's next big hit, "King Size Papa") were achieved with practically no airplay. The recording successfully crossed over into the pop music market, where at the time Bing Crosby and Perry Como reigned supreme. The song had inspired the title of Freddie Hart's hit "Snatch It and Grab It" (1956).

In writing "Snatch and Grab It", Pease had shown an ability to match the material to a performer, the "three-minute lesson in lechery bursting with thigh-slapping vulgarity" fitted Lee's onstage persona.

== Sources ==
- Millar, Bill (1999). "Kansas City Stars. Part 1. Julia Lee". In Colin Escott (ed.). All Roots Lead to Rock: Legends of Early Rock 'n' Roll. Schirmer Books. pp. 27–42. ISBN 978-0-02-864866-8. OCLC 1022595608.
- Martin, Mackenzie (June 11, 2022). "Julia Lee pioneered blues 'too risque' for the radio". npr.org. National Public Radio.
