= Old Maid Boogie =

"Old Maid Boogie" is a 1947 song by Eddie Vinson and His Orchestra. The single went to number one on the U.S. R&B chart for two weeks and was Eddie Vinson's most successful of three releases. The B-side of "Old Maid Boogie", a song entitled "Kidney Stew Blues", made it to number five on the R&B chart a few weeks later.

== See also ==
- List of Billboard number-one R&B singles of the 1940s
