= Regis Records =

British classical music record label

Regis Records is a British classical music record label based in Milborne St Andrew, Dorset which is mainly known for re-releases out of print recordings by other, sometimes defunct, British independent labels. The record label is a side business of Selections, a gardening mail order company, and also distributes other labels.

== Reissues ==
Among the notable out of print recordings reissued by Regis are selections from the back catalogues of:

- CRD Records
- Unicorn-Kanchana
- Collins Classics
