= Savannah Churchill =

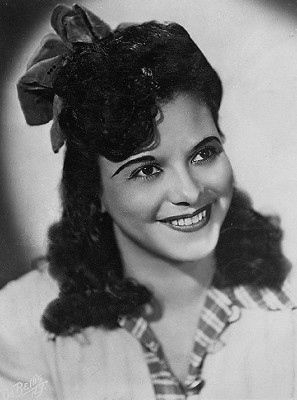

Background information
- Born: Savannah Valentine Roberts; August 21, 1920; Colfax, Louisiana, U.S.
- Died: April 19, 1974 (aged 53) Brooklyn, New York, U.S.
- Genres: R&B, blues, pop
- Occupations: Singer, musician
- Instrument: Piano
- Years active: 1942–1960
- Labels: Beacon; Capitol; Manor; Regal; RCA Victor; Decca; Argo; Jamie
- Formerly of: Benny Carter Orchestra; The Four Tunes

Savannah Churchill (born Savannah Valentine Roberts; August 21, 1920 – April 19, 1974) was an American rhythm and blues singer in the 1940s and 1950s. She is best known for her number-one R&B single "I Want To Be Loved (But Only By You)."

== Life and career ==
Born to Creole parents Emmett Roberts and Hazel Hickman in Colfax, Louisiana, her family moved to Brooklyn, New York when she was three. Growing up, Churchill played violin and sang with the choir at St. Peter Claver Catholic Church and School in Brooklyn. She graduated from Brooklyn's Girls' High School.

In the 1930 and 1940 United States Censuses, Churchill and her parents are listed as Negro, as Louisiana Creoles were required to do at the time. Churchill never denied her African American ancestry even as she attained fame, and she appeared in black publications such as Jet magazine.

In 1939, Churchill quit her job as a waitress to pursue a singing career. She began singing at Small's Paradise in Harlem, earning $18 a week. Churchill performed with the Crystal Caraverns in Washington, D.C., and then toured with Edgar Hayes band in 1941.

Churchill's first recordings, including the risqué "Fat Meat Is Good Meat", issued on Beacon Records in 1942. These were followed the next year by recordings on Capitol with the Benny Carter Orchestra, including her first hit, "Hurry, Hurry".

In 1945, Churchill signed with Irving Berman's Manor Records, and that year "Daddy Daddy" peaked at No. 3 on the R&B chart. Two years later, she reached No. 1 on the R&B chart with "I Want To Be Loved (But Only By You)", which topped the charts for eight weeks. The record was billed as being with vocal group The Sentimentalists, who soon renamed themselves The Four Tunes. Subsequent recordings with The Four Tunes, including "Time Out For Tears" (No. 10 R&B, No. 24 pop) and "I Want To Cry", both in 1948, were also successful.

Billed as "Sex-Sational", Churchill performed to much acclaim, and appeared in the movies Miracle in Harlem (1948) and Souls of Sin (1949). The films feature African American casts.

From 1949, Churchill recorded with Regal, RCA Victor and Decca Records, recording the original version of "Shake A Hand", later a big hit for Faye Adams, also recording with the Ray Charles Singers.

By 1952, Churchill became one of the top box-office attractions at the Apollo Theater in Harlem, the Regal Theater in Chicago, the Howard Theater in Washington, D.C., and the Palladium in London. She toured widely with backing vocal group The Striders, including a visit to Hawaii in 1954.

In 1953, Churchill released gospel tunes on Decca Records. In 1956, she was one of the first artists signed to the Argo label, set up as a subsidiary to Chess Records.

Churchill's career ended in 1956 when, as she was singing on stage in a club, a drunken man fell on top of her from a balcony above, causing severe, debilitating injuries from which she would never fully recover. Although she did some recording in 1960, releasing her debut album Time Out For Tears on Jamie Records, her health declined greatly until her death from pneumonia in Brooklyn in 1974.

== Personal life ==
Savannah Churchill moved from Louisiana to Bedford-Stuyvesant, Brooklyn in New York with her mother Hazel Roberts and stepfather. She attended St. Peter Claver catholic school and later Girls High School. They had a house on Quincy Street that formerly had a carriage house with a horse stable in the back yard. Churchill later had two children with her first husband, David Churchill, who was killed in a car accident in 1941. On May 19, 1952, Churchill remarried, to Jesse Johnson in Franklin, Ohio.

== Discography ==
=== Chart singles ===
Year	Single	Chart Positions	
Year	Single	US Pop	US R&B
1945	"Daddy, Daddy"	-	3
1947	"I Want to Be Loved (But Only by You)"	21	1
1948	"Time Out for Tears"	20	10
1948	"I Want to Cry"	-	14
1951	"(It's No) Sin"	5	-
1953	"Shake a Hand"	22	-

== Filmography ==
- Miracle in Harlem (1948)
- Souls of Sin (1949)
