= Nellie Lutcher =

American R&B and jazz singer (1912–2007)

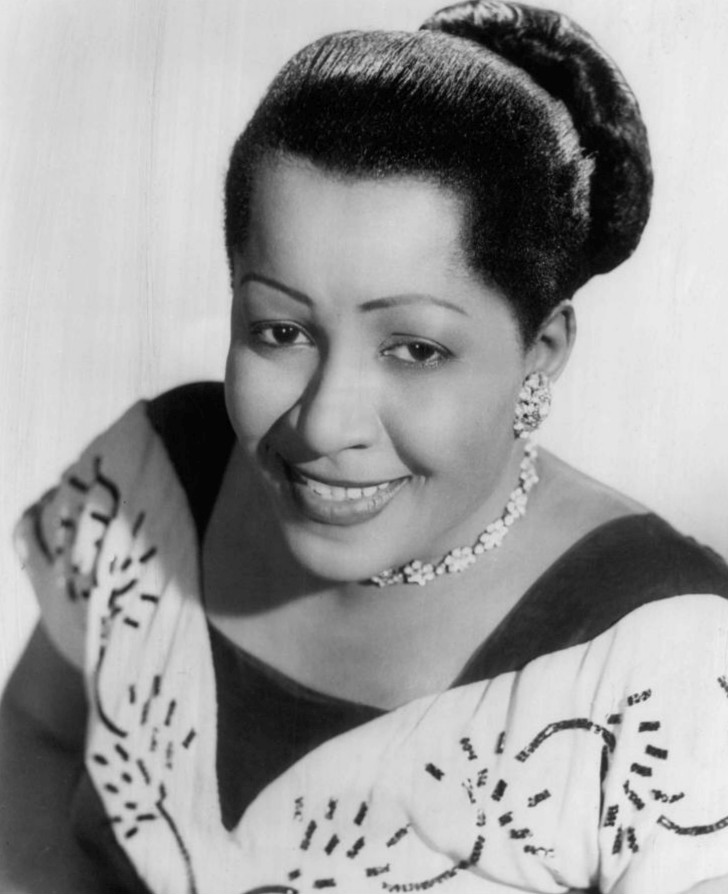
- Lutcher in 1950

Background information
- Born: Nellie Rose Lutcher; October 15, 1912; Lake Charles, Louisiana, U.S.
- Died: June 8, 2007 (aged 94) Los Angeles, California, U.S.
- Genres: Jazz, R&B
- Occupation: Musician
- Labels: Capitol, Okeh, Decca, Liberty
- Formerly of: Clarence Hart, Nat "King" Cole
- Past members: Charles Burrell (musician)

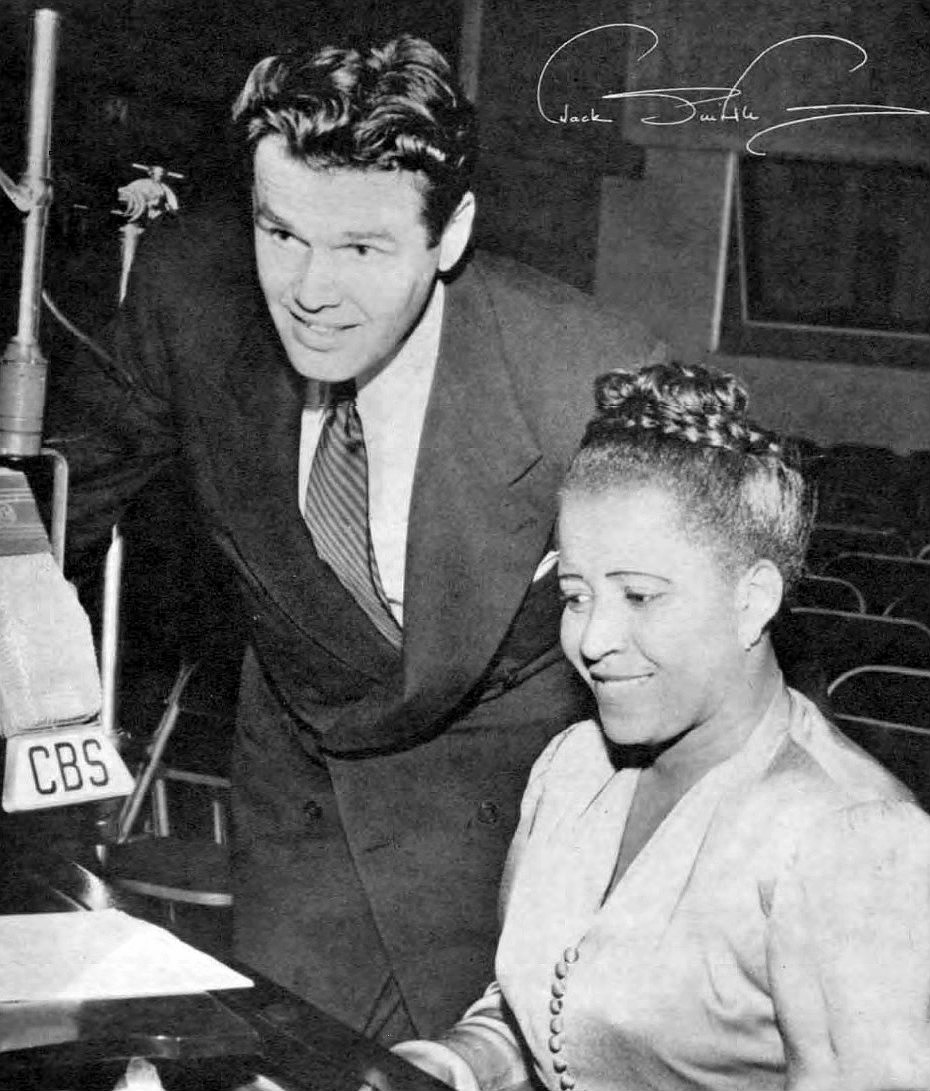
Nellie Lutcher as a guest on The Jack Smith Show (1948)

Nellie Rose Lutcher (October 15, 1912 – June 8, 2007) was an American R&B and jazz singer and pianist, who gained prominence in the late 1940s and early 1950s. Lutcher was most recognizable for her diction and exaggerated pronunciation and was credited as an influence by Nina Simone among others.

== Childhood ==
Lutcher was born in Lake Charles, Louisiana, the eldest daughter of the 15 children of Isaac and Suzie Lutcher. She was the sister of saxophonist Joe Lutcher. Her father was a bass player and her mother a church organist. She received piano lessons, and her father formed a family band with her playing piano. At age 12, she played with Ma Rainey, when Rainey's regular pianist fell ill and had to be left behind in the previous town. Searching for a temporary replacement in Lake Charles, one of the neighbors told Rainey that there was a little girl who played in church who might be able to do it.

== Career ==
Aged 15, Lutcher joined her father in Clarence Hart's Imperial Jazz Band, and in her mid-teens also briefly married the band's trumpet player. In 1933, she joined the Southern Rhythm Boys, writing their arrangements and touring widely. In 1935, she moved to Los Angeles, where she married Leonel Lewis and had a son. She began to play swing piano, and also to sing, in small combos throughout the area, and began developing her own style, influenced by Earl Hines, Duke Ellington and her friend Nat "King" Cole.

She was not widely known until 1947 when she learned of the March of Dimes talent show at Hollywood High School, and performed. The show was broadcast on the radio and her performance caught the ear of Dave Dexter, a scout for Capitol Records. She was signed by Capitol and made several records, including "The One I Love (Belongs to Somebody Else)" and her first hit single, the risqué "Hurry On Down", which went to No. 2 on the Billboard rhythm and blues chart and sold a million copies globally. This was followed by her equally successful composition "He's A Real Gone Guy", which also made No. 2 on the R&B chart and crossed over to the pop chart where it reached No. 15.

In 1948, she had a string of further R&B chart hits, the most successful being "Fine Brown Frame", her third No. 2 R&B hit. Her songs charted on the pop, jazz, and R&B charts, she toured widely and became well known. She wrote many of her own songs and, unlike many other African-American artists of the period, retained the valuable publishing rights to them.

In 1950, Lutcher duetted with Nat "King" Cole on "For You My Love" and "Can I Come in for a Second". The same year, her records began to be released in the UK and were actively promoted by radio DJ Jack Jackson. She headlined a UK variety tour, compered by Jackson, with great success, later returning there to tour on her own.

With an orchestra for the first time, Lutcher recorded "The Birth of the Blues" and "I Want to Be Near You" in 1951, but she was losing her appeal with the record-buying public and Capitol dropped her the following year. She went on to record, much less successfully, for other labels including Okeh, Decca and Liberty, and gradually wound down her performance schedule.

In 1952, Lutcher was contacted to perform on first a "happy new years" television special, however after she finished her song, it was revealed that she was on the set of, and the honoree of, a This Is Your Life episode.

She died in Los Angeles in 2007, aged 94. She was the aunt of Latin jazz percussionist Darryl "Munyungo" Jackson and singer Jacquelyn Levy.

== Discography ==
- Nellie Lutcher (album of three 78 records, Capitol, 1950))
- Real Gone! (Capitol, 1950)
- Whee! Nellie! (10" album, Epic, 1955)
- Our New Nellie (with Russ Garcia And His Orchestra) (Liberty, 1956)
