= 1948 in music =

This is a list of notable events in music that took place in the year 1948.

== Specific locations ==
- 1948 in British music
- 1948 in Norwegian music

== Specific genres ==
- 1948 in country music
- 1948 in jazz

== Events ==
- January 10 – The Amadeus Quartet gives its first recital under this name, at the Wigmore Hall in London.
- February 25 – First Nice Jazz Festival with Louis Armstrong, Stéphane Grappelli, Claude Luter, Mezz Mezzrow and Django Reinhardt. It is during this first edition that Suzy Delair sings for the first time the song "C'est si bon" to a cabaret where Louis Armstrong ended his evening.
- March 20 – Renowned Italian conductor Arturo Toscanini makes his television debut, conducting the NBC Symphony Orchestra in the United States in a program featuring the works of Richard Wagner.
- April 3 – Beethoven's Symphony No. 9 is played on television in its entirety for the first time in a concert featuring Toscanini conducting the NBC Symphony Orchestra. The chorus was prepared by Robert Shaw.
- April 21 – National Youth Orchestra of Great Britain gives its first concert.
- May 20 – The Second International Congress of Composers and Music Critics 1948 opens in Prague.
- June 5 – Opening of the first Aldeburgh Festival, founded by Benjamin Britten, Eric Crozier and Peter Pears.
- Summer – John Cage begins teaching at Black Mountain College in North Carolina.
- June 21 – Columbia Records introduces the long-playing record album in a public demonstration at the Waldorf-Astoria Hotel in New York City.
- November 29 – First live telecast of a complete opera by the Metropolitan Opera, of the opening-night performance of Giuseppe Verdi's Otello, starring Ramón Vinay, Licia Albanese, and Leonard Warren, on ABC-TV
- December – Perry Como has his first television Christmas Special.
- Hans Werner Henze becomes musical assistant at the Deutscher Theater in Konstanz.
- Al Jolson is voted the "Most Popular Male Vocalist" of the year by a Variety poll.
- Patti Page becomes the first artist to use the technique of multi-track overdubbing (later popularized by Les Paul & Mary Ford).
- Columbia Records introduces the 33 1/3 rpm LP ("long playing") record at New York's Waldorf-Astoria Hotel, featuring 25 minutes of music per side, compared to the four minutes per side of the 78 rpm record, the previous standard for gramophone records.
- Otis Rush moves to Chicago and begins his musical career.
- Igor Stravinsky and Robert Craft meet for the first time.
- Quartetto Cetra dubs the choruses for the Italian release of Disney's Dumbo.
- Gabriel von Wayditch begins work on his last opera The Heretics, which is still not completed when he dies in 1969. However, he completed the piano score of the massive 8.5 hour work, which is listed in the Guinness Book of World Records as the world's longest opera.
- Bruno Maderna meets Hermann Scherchen for the first time: a fundamental encounter.
- John Serry Sr. meets his mentor, the composer Robert Strassburg for the first time while concertizing nightly at the Waldorf Astoria Hotel in New York City.

== Albums released ==
- The Jolson Album Vol. 2 – Al Jolson
- Christmas Songs by Sinatra – Frank Sinatra
- Selections from Road to Rio – Bing Crosby, Andrews Sisters
- Concierto de Aranjuez – Regino Sainz de la Maza and the Orquesta Nacional de España

== Top popular records ==
The following songs appeared in The Billboard's 'Best Selling Retail Records', 'Records Most-Played On the Air' and 'Most Played Juke Box Records' charts, starting November 1947 and before December 1948. Each week fifteen points were awarded to the number one record, then nine points for number two, eight points for number three, and so on. This system rewards songs that reach the highest positions, as well as those that had the longest chart runs. The total of a song's complete chart run is determined (never cutoff at the end of December, as in The Billboard's year-end lists), then the three Popular charts are combined, with that number determining a record's year-end rank. Regional charts determine the 11-25 rankings each week, and records that failed to score on the main chart were ranked by highest position. If a record scored on only one or two of the popular charts, it will obviously rank lower than a national hit on radios and juke boxes. Additional information from other sources is reported, but not used for ranking. This includes dates obtained from the "Discography of American Historical Recordings" website, chart performance from 'Most Played Juke Box Race Records', 'Most Played Juke Box Folk (Hillbilly) Records', 'Cashbox', and other sources as noted.

Rank	Artist	Title	Label	Recorded	Released	Chart positions
1	Dinah Shore and Her Happy Boys	"Buttons and Bows"	Columbia 38284	November 30, 1947	August 16, 1948	US Billboard 1948 #1, US #1 for 10 weeks, 23 total weeks, 577 points, CashBox #1, Grammy Hall of Fame in 1998, sold 2.5 million
2	Pee Wee Hunt Orchestra	"Twelfth Street Rag"	Capitol 15105	November 8, 1947	June 1948	US Billboard 1948 #2, US #1 for 8 weeks, 32 total weeks, 559 points, CashBox #34
3	Peggy Lee (Dave Barbour Orchestra)	"Mañana (Is Soon Enough for Me)"	Capitol 15022	November 25, 1947	January 1948	US Billboard 1948 #3, US #1 for 9 weeks, 21 total weeks, 551 points, CashBox #16
4	Margaret Whiting	"A Tree in the Meadow"	Capitol 15122	May 28, 1948	July 1948	US Billboard 1948 #4, US #1 for 5 weeks, 23 total weeks, 424 points, CashBox #3
5	Art Mooney and his Orchestra	"I'm Looking Over a Four Leaf Clover"	MGM 10119	November 21, 1947	December 1947	US Billboard 1948 #5, US #1 for 5 weeks, 18 total weeks, 413 points, CashBox #10
6	King Cole	"Nature Boy"	Capitol 15054	December 18, 1946	March 29, 1948	US Billboard 1948 #6, US #1 for 8 weeks, 18 total weeks, 386 points, CashBox #4
7	Bing Crosby	"Now is the Hour"	Decca 24279	November 8, 1947	January 1948	US Billboard 1948 #7, US #1 for 3 weeks, 23 total weeks, 383 points, CashBox #2
8	Jon and Sondra Steele	"My Happiness"	Damon 11133	April 1948	April 1948	US Billboard 1948 #8, US #2 for 2 weeks, 30 total weeks, 380 points, CashBox #6
9	Al Trace and His New Orchestra	You Call Everybody Darlin'	Regent 117	1948	May 1948	US Billboard 1948 #9, US #1 for 6 weeks, 24 total weeks, 378 points, CashBox #18
10	Kay Kyser and his Orchestra	"Woody Woodpecker"	Columbia 38197	December 31, 1947	May 10, 1948	US Billboard 1948 #10, US #1 for 6 weeks, 15 total weeks, 360 points, CashBox #5
11	Ken Griffin (Organ) (Vocal Jerry Wayne)	"You Can't Be True, Dear"	Rondo 228	April 26, 1947	March 1948	US Billboard 1948 #11, US #1 for 7 weeks, 23 total weeks, 341 points, CashBox #9
12	Kay Kyser and his Orchestra	"On a Slow Boat to China"	Columbia 38301	November 9, 1947	September 13, 1948	US Billboard 1948 #12, US #2 for 7 weeks, 20 total weeks, 328 points
13	Jo Stafford and Gordon MacRae	"My Darling, My Darling"	Capitol 15270	September 23, 1948	October 1948	US Billboard 1948 #13, US #1 for 1 weeks, 17 total weeks, 253 points
14	Dick Haymes	"Little White Lies"	Decca 24280	November 3, 1947	December 1947	US Billboard 1948 #14, US #2 for 1 week, 23 total weeks, 250 points
15	The Pied Pipers	"My Happiness"	Capitol 15278	April 18, 1948	May 1948	US Billboard 1948 #15, US #3 for 1 week, 27 total weeks, 247 points
16	Doris Day	"It's Magic"	Columbia 38188	November 15, 1947	June 1948	US Billboard 1948 #16, US #2 for 1 week, 21 total weeks, 229 points, CashBox #7
17	Ken Griffin	"You Can't Be True, Dear"	Rondo 128	August 20, 1947	April 1948	US Billboard 1948 #17, US #2 for 7 weeks, 15 total weeks, 224 points
18	Doris Day and Buddy Clark	"Love Somebody"	Columbia 38174	November 15, 1947	April 19, 1948	US Billboard 1948 #18, US #1 for 5 weeks, 24 total weeks, 214 points
19	Gordon Jenkins and His Orchestra	"Maybe You'll Be There"	Decca 24403	February 27, 1947	May 1948	US Billboard 1948 #19, US #1 for 2 weeks, 15 total weeks, 188 points
20	Francis Craig and His Orchestra	"Beg Your Pardon"	Bullet 1012	1947	January 5, 1948	US Billboard 1948 #20, US #3 for 1 week, 20 total weeks, 188 points, sold 2.5 million
25	Spike Jones and His City Slickers	"All I Want for Christmas Is My Two Front Teeth"	RCA Victor 20-3177	December 19, 1947	November 1948	US Billboard 1948 #25, US #1 for 3 weeks, 8 total week, 138 points
30	Mel Blanc and the Sportsmen	"Woody Woodpecker"	Capitol 15278	July 4, 1948	July 18, 1948	US Billboard 1948 #30, US #2 for 5 weeks, 9 total weeks, 81 points
56	Gene Autry	"Here Comes Santa Claus (Right Down Santa Claus Lane)"	Columbia 37942	August 28, 1947	May 1, 1948	US Billboard 1948 #56, US #8 for 1 week, 5 total weeks, US Hillbilly 1948 #24, USHB #4 for 1 week, 7 total weeks, 35 points
134	Gene Autry	"Buttons and Bows"	Columbia 20469	December 26, 1947	August 16, 1948	US Billboard 1948 #134, US #17 for 1 week, 3 total weeks, US Hillbilly 1948 #30, USHB #6 for 1 weeks, 12 total weeks, 17 points

=== The Billboard's Top Race Records ===
The following songs appeared in The Billboard's Most-Played Juke Box Race Records and Best-Selling Retail Race Records charts, starting November 1947 through November 1948. Each week twenty points were awarded to the number one record, then fourteen points for number two, thirteen points for number three, and so on. This system rewards songs that reach the highest positions, as well as those that had the longest chart runs. Also see Billboard Top Race Records of 1948.

Rank	Artist	Title	Label	Recorded	Released	Chart Positions
1	Sonny Thompson with The Sharps and Flats	"Long Gone"	Miracle 126	April 23, 1947	August 1947	US Billboard 1948 #339, US pop charts #29 for 1 week, 1 total weeks, US Billboard Top Race Records 1948 #1, Race Records charts #1 for 5 weeks, 31 total weeks, 700 points
2	Lonnie Johnson	"Tomorrow Night"	King 4201	1947	May 1947	US Billboard 1948 #149, US pop charts #19 for 1 week, 3 total weeks, US Billboard Top Race Records 1948 #2, Race Records charts #1 for 7 weeks, 18 total weeks, 622 points
3	Amos Milburn	"Chicken Shack Boogie"	Aladdin 3014	November 19, 1947	September 1948	US Billboard Top Race Records 1948 #3, Race Records charts #1 for 5 weeks, 23 total weeks, 577 points
4	Ivory Joe Hunter	"Pretty Mama Blues"	Pacific 637	November 30, 1947	August 16, 1948	US Billboard Top Race Records 1948 #4, Race Records charts #1 for 3 weeks, 25 total weeks, 530 points
5	Wynonie Harris	"Good Rockin' Tonight"	King 4210	December 28, 1947	June 1948	US Billboard Top Race Records 1948 #5, Race Records charts #1 for 1 week, 25 total weeks, 519 points
6	Red Miller Trio	"Bewildered"	Bullet 295	November 25, 1947	January 1948	US Billboard Top Race Records 1948 #6, Race Records charts #1 for 5 weeks, 21 total weeks, 486 points
7	Hal Singer Sextette	"Corn Bread"	Savoy 671	June 1948	March 1949	US Billboard Top Race Records 1948 #7, Race Records charts #1 for 4 weeks, 21 total weeks, 482 points
8	Julia Lee and Her Boy Friends	"King Size Papa"	Capitol Americana 40082	November 11, 1947	September 1947	US Billboard 1948 #128, US pop charts #15 for 1 week, 3 total weeks, US Billboard Top Race Records 1948 #8, Race Records charts #1 for 9 weeks, 28 total weeks, 451 points
9	Bull Moose Jackson and His Buffalo Bearcats	"I Can't Go on Without You"	King 4230	December 1947	February 1949	US Billboard Top Race Records 1948 #9, Race Records charts #1 for 8 weeks, 17 total weeks, 418 points
10	Memphis Slim and His House Rockers	"Messin' Around"	Miracle 125	January 13, 1949	March 1949	US Billboard Top Race Records 1948 #10, Race Records charts #1 for 2 weeks, 25 total weeks, 403 points
11	Amos Milburn	"Bewildered"	Aladdin 3018	October 15, 1948	March 1949	US Billboard Top Race Records 1948 #11, Race Records charts #1 for 3 weeks, 16 total weeks, 384 points
12	Arbee Stidham	"My Heart Belongs to You"	RCA Victor 20-2572	September 18, 1947	August 1, 1949	US Billboard Top Race Records 1948 #12, Race Records charts #1 for 1 week, 24 total weeks, 372 points
13	Bull Moose Jackson and His Buffalo Bearcats	"I Love You Yes I Do"	King 4181	August 15, 1947	February 1948	US Billboard 1948 #182, US pop charts #21 for 1 week, 3 total weeks, US Billboard Top Race Records 1948 #13, Race Records charts #1 for 3 weeks, 26 total weeks, 352 points
14	Louis Jordan and His Tympany Five	"Run Joe"	Decca 24448	April 23, 1947	November 1946	US Billboard 1948 #240, US pop charts #23 for 1 week, 3 total weeks, US Billboard Top Race Records 1948 #14, Race Records charts #1 for 2 weeks, 15 total weeks, 324 points
15	Roy Brown and His Orchestra	"Long About Midnight"	DeLuxe 3154	January 13, 1949	March 1949	US Billboard Top Race Records 1948 #15, Race Records charts #1 for 1 week, 17 total weeks, 313 points
16	Bull Moose Jackson and His Buffalo Bearcats	"All My Love Belongs To You"	King 4189	January 20, 1949	February 1949	US Billboard Top Race Records 1948 #16, Race Records charts #3 for 2 weeks, 17 total weeks, 273 points
17	Pee Wee Crayton and His Guitar	"Blues After Hours"	Modern 624	January 13, 1949	March 1949	US Billboard Top Race Records 1948 #17, Race Records charts #1 for 3 weeks, 13 total weeks, 256 points
18	The Orioles	"It's Too Soon to Know"	It's A Natural 5000	January 13, 1949	March 1949	US Billboard 1948 #110, US pop charts #13 for 1 week, 7 total weeks, US Billboard Top Race Records 1948 #18, Race Records charts #1 for 1 weeks, 17 total weeks, 239 points
19	Nellie Lutcher and Her Rhythm	"Fine Brown Frame"	Capitol 15032	December 27, 1947	July 1947	US Billboard 1948 #195, US pop charts #21 for 1 week, 2 total weeks, US Billboard Top Race Records 1948 #19, Race Records charts #2 for 3 weeks, 17 total weeks, 229 points
20	Dinah Washington	"Am I Asking Too Much"	Mercury 8095	November 1947	March 1949	US Billboard Top Race Records 1948 #20, Race Records charts #1 for 1 weeks, 14 total weeks, 219 points
21	Paula Watson	"A Little Bird Told Me"	Supreme 1507	October 12, 1948	November 1948	US Billboard 1949 #44, US pop charts #6 for 1 weeks, 16 total weeks, US Billboard Top Race Records 1948 #21, Race Records charts #2 for 1 weeks, 14 total weeks, 203 points
22	Sonny Thompson with The Sharps and Flats	"Late Freight"	Miracle 128	April 23, 1947	August 1947	US Billboard 1948 #205, US pop charts #21 for 1 week, 1 total weeks, US Billboard Top Race Records 1948 #22, Race Records charts #1 for 1 week, 11 total weeks, 200 points
23	King Cole	"Nature Boy"	Capitol 15054	December 18, 1946	March 29, 1948	US Billboard 1948 #6, US pop charts #1 for 8 weeks, 18 total weeks, US Billboard Top Race Records 1948 #23, Race Records charts #2 for 1 week, 12 total weeks, 198 points
24	The Ravens	"Send for Me if You Need Me"	National 9045	December 22, 1947	March 1949	US Billboard Top Race Records 1948 #24, Race Records charts #4 for 1 week, 11 total weeks, 165 points
25	Louis Jordan and His Tympany Five	"Barnyard Boogie"	Decca 24300	April 23, 1947	November 1946	US Billboard Top Race Records 1948 #25, Race Records charts #2 for 4 weeks, 13 total weeks, 152 points

== Published popular music ==
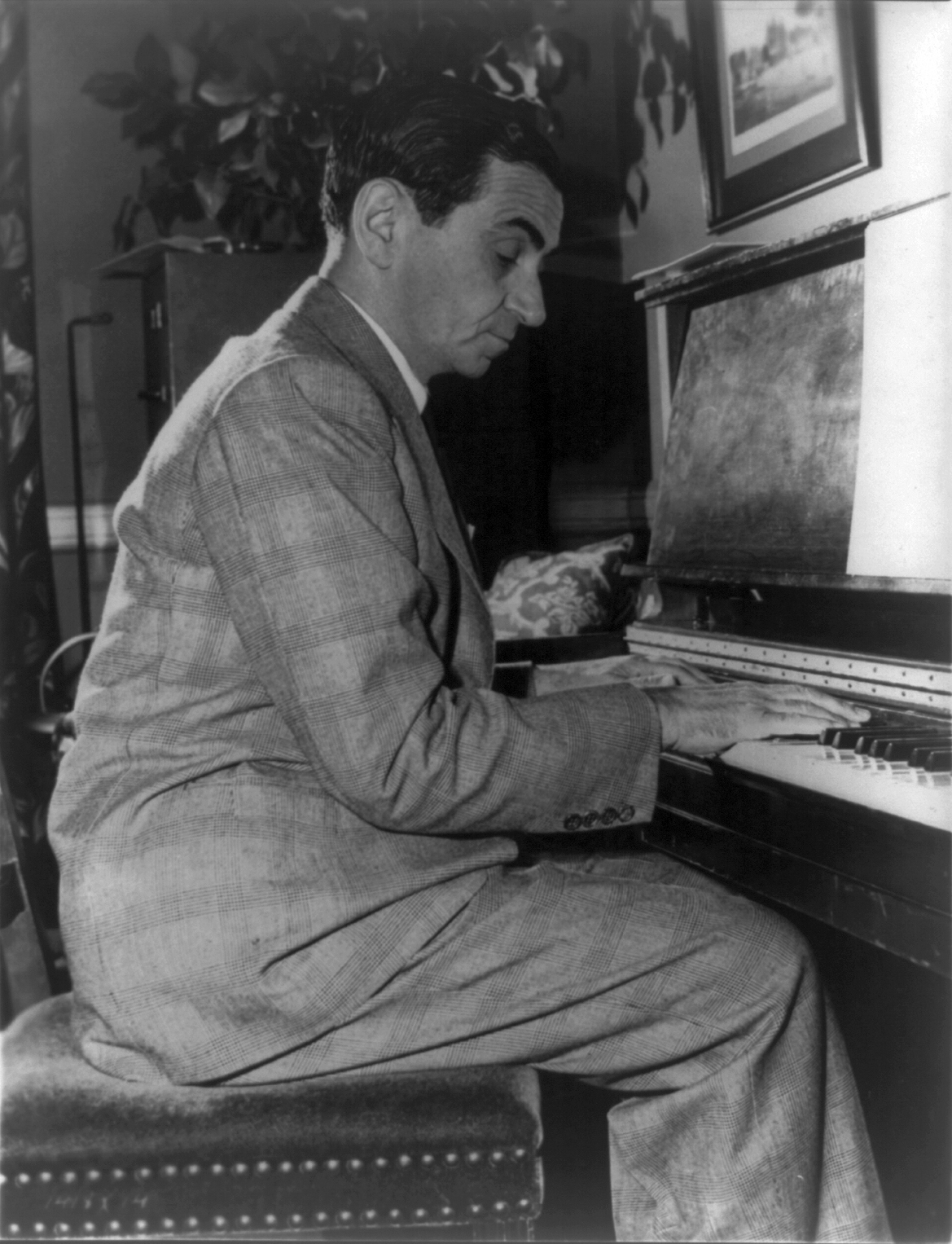
Songwriter Irving Berlin in 1948

- "'A' You're Adorable" words and music: Buddy Kaye, Fred Wise & Sidney Lippman
- "Always True to You in My Fashion" w.m. Cole Porter introduced by Lisa Kirk in the musical Kiss Me, Kate. Performed in the film version by Ann Miller and Tommy Rall
- "Another Op'nin', Another Show" w.m. Cole Porter introduced by Annabelle Hill and the ensemble in the musical Kiss Me, Kate
- "Baby, It's Cold Outside" w.m. Frank Loesser
- "Be a Clown" w.m. Cole Porter introduced by Judy Garland and Gene Kelly in the film The Pirate
- "Bibbidi-Bobbidi-Boo (The Magic Song)" w.m. Mack David, Al Hoffman & Jerry Livingston
- "Black Coffee" w. Paul Francis Webster m. Sonny Burke
- "Black Market" w.m. Frederick Hollander
- "Blue Christmas" w.m. Billy Hayes & Jay Johnson
- "The Blue Skirt Waltz" w. Mitchell Parish m. Vaclav Blaha
- "Brush Up Your Shakespeare" w.m. Cole Porter introduced by Harry Clark and Jack Diamond in the musical Kiss Me, Kate. Memorably Performed in the film version by Keenan Wynn and James Whitmore.
- "Candy Kisses" w.m. George Morgan
- "Careless Hands" w. Bob Hilliard m. Carl Sigman
- "Comme Ci, Comme Ça" w. (Eng) Joan Whitney & Alex Kramer (Fr) Pierre Dudan m. Bruno Coquatrix
- "A Couple Of Swells" w.m. Irving Berlin. Introduced by Fred Astaire and Judy Garland in the film Easter Parade
- "The Deck Of Cards" w.m. T. Texas Tyler
- "Don't Look Now But My Heart Is Showing" w. Ann Ronell m. Kurt Weill from the film version of One Touch of Venus
- "Far Away Places" w.m. Joan Whitney & Alex Kramer
- "Forever And Ever" w. (Eng) Malia Rosa (Ger) Franz Winkler m. Franz Winkler
- "Hair Of Gold, Eyes Of Blue" w.m. Sunny Skylar
- "Hang On The Bell, Nellie" w.m. Tommie Connor, Clive Erard & Ross Parker
- "Hooray for Love" w. Leo Robin m. Harold Arlen. Introduced by Tony Martin in the film Casbah
- "I Am Ashamed That Women Are So Simple" w.m. Cole Porter. Introduced by Patricia Morison in the musical Kiss Me Kate.
- "I'm Beginning To Miss You" w.m. Irving Berlin
- "I've Come To Wive It Wealthily In Padua" w.m. Cole Porter introduced by Alfred Drake in the musical Kiss Me, Kate. Sung in the film version by Howard Keel.
- "I've Got a Lovely Bunch of Coconuts" w.m. Fred Heatherton
- "Make A Miracle" w.m. Frank Loesser. Introduced by Ray Bolger and Allyn McLerie in the musical Where's Charley?
- "My Darling, My Darling" w.m. Frank Loesser. Introduced in the musical Where's Charley? by Byron Palmer and Doretta Morrow
- "My Happiness" w. Betty Peterson m. Borney Bergantine
- "N'yot N'yow (The Pussycat Song)" w.m. Dick Manning
- "O Mein Papa" w.m. Paul Burkhard
- "Once In Love With Amy" w.m. Frank Loesser
- "Pecos Bill" w. Johnny Lange m. Eliot Daniel
- "Powder Your Face With Sunshine" w.m. Carmen Lombardo & Stanley Rochinski
- "Red Roses For A Blue Lady" w.m. Sid Tepper & Roy C. Bennett
- "Say Something Sweet" w.m. Sid Tepper & Roy C. Bennett
- "Shoes With Wings On" w. Ira Gershwin m. Harry Warren
- "So In Love" w.m. Cole Porter introduced by Patricia Morison in the musical Kiss Me, Kate. Performed in the film version by Kathryn Grayson and Howard Keel.
- "Sunflower" Mack David
- "Tennessee Waltz" w.m. Redd Stewart & Pee Wee King
- "The Three Bells" w. (Eng) Bert Reisfeld m. Jean Villard
- "Tom, Dick or Harry" w.m. Cole Porter introduced by Lisa Kirk, Harold Lang, Edwin Clay and Charles Wood in the musical Kiss Me, Kate. Sung in the film version by Ann Miller, Tommy Rall, Bobby Van and Bob Fosse.
- "Too Darn Hot" w.m. Cole Porter introduced by Lorenzo Fuller, Fred Davis and Eddie Sledge in the musical Kiss Me, Kate. Ann Miller sang and danced the number in the film version.
- "A Tree In The Meadow" w.m. Billy Reid
- "Uncle Charlie's Polka" m. John Serry Sr.
- "Where Is The Life That Late I Led?" w.m. Cole Porter introduced by Alfred Drake in the musical Kiss Me, Kate. Sung by Howard Keel in the film version.
- "Why Can't You Behave?" w.m. Cole Porter introduced by Lisa Kirk and Harold Lang in the musical Kiss Me, Kate. Performed by Ann Miller in the film version.
- "Wunderbar" w.m. Cole Porter introduced by Alfred Drake and Patricia Morison in the musical Kiss Me, Kate. Performed by Howard Keel and Kathryn Grayson.
- "You Can't Be True, Dear" w.(Eng) Hal Cotton (Ger) Gerhard Ebeler m. Hans Otten
- "You Say The Nicest Things, Baby" w. Harold Adamson m. Jimmy McHugh
- "You're All I Want For Christmas" w.m. Glen Moore & Seger Ellis
- "You're Breaking My Heart" w.m. Pat Genaro & Sunny Skylar

== Classical music ==
=== Premieres ===
Composer	Composition	Date	Location	Performers
Antheil, George	Symphony No. 5	1948-12-31	Philadelphia	Philadelphia Orchestra – Ormandy
Barber, Samuel	Excursions	1948-12-22	New York City	Behrend
Barber, Samuel	Knoxville: Summer of 1915	1948-04-09	Boston	Steber / Boston Symphony – Koussevitzky
Berg, Alban	Altenberg Lieder (1912)	1948-09-14	Venice (Biennale)	Martin-Metten / La Fenice – Scherchen
Berkeley, Lennox	Piano Concerto	1948-08-31	London (Proms)	Horsley / London Symphony – Cameron
Britten, Benjamin	A Charm of Lullabies	1948-01-03	The Hague	Evans, De Nobel
Britten, Benjamin	Saint Nicolas, cantata	1948-06-05	Aldeburgh Festival	Pears / Aldeburgh Festival Chorus – Woodgate
Cage, John	In a Landscape	1948-08-20	Black Mountain, North Carolina	Cage
Cage, John	Suite for Toy Piano	1948-08-22	Black Mountain, North Carolina	Cage
Castelnuovo-Tedesco, Mario	Coriolano, overture	1948-09-08	Venice Biennale	RAI Symphony Orchestra in Rome – Previtali
Cerha, Friedrich	Six Lieder	1948-11-30	Vienna	Ceska, Wünsch
Copland, Aaron	The Red Pony suite	1948-10-30	Houston	Houston Symphony, Kurtz
Dallapiccola, Luigi	Quattro liriche di Antonio Machado	1948-12-03	Brussels	Martin-Metten, Dallapiccola
Diamond, David	Symphony No. 4	1948-01-23	Boston	Boston Symphony – Koussevitzky
Dohnányi, Ernst von	Symphony No. 2 (1944)	1948-11-23	London	Chelsea Symphony – Del Mar
Dutilleux, Henri	Piano Sonata	1948-04-30	Paris	Joy
Fine, Irving	Toccata Concertante	1948-10-22	Boston	Boston Symphony – Koussevitzky
Foss, Lukas	Recordare	1948-12-31	Boston	Boston Symphony – Koussevitzky
Hanson, Howard	Piano Concerto	1948-12-31	Boston	Firkusny / Boston Symphony – Hanson
Henze, Hans Werner	Symphony No. 1	1948-08-26	Bad Pyrmont, Germany	[unknown orchestra] – Fortner
Henze, Hans Werner	Violin Concerto No. 1	1948-12-12	Baden-Baden, Germany	Stanske / SWF Symphony – Bour
Hindemith, Paul	Das Marienleben (2nd version)	1948-11-03	Hannover	Kupper, Seemann
Ives, Charles	Piano Trio (1915)	1948-05-28	Berea, Ohio	Poinar, Pierce, Wolaver
Ives, Charles	Three Harvest Home Chorales (1915)	1948-03-03	New York City	The Collegiate Chorale – Shaw
Jolivet, André	Concerto for Ondes Martenot	1948-04-23	Vienna	Martenot / [unknown orchestra] – Jolivet
Jolivet, André	Suite delphique	1948-04-22	Vienna	Vienna Philharmonic – Jolivet
Kabalevsky, Dmitry	Violin Concerto	1948-10-29	Moscow	Bezrodny / Moscow Conservatory Symphony – Terian
Lutosławski, Witold	Symphony No. 1	1948-04-06	Katowice, Poland	Polish National Radio Symphony – Fitelberg
Maderna, Bruno	Concerto for Two Pianos	1948-09-17	Venice Biennale	Gorini, Lorenzi / [unknown ensemble] – Gracis
Malipiero, Gian Francesco	Sinfonia in memoriam (Symphony No. 4)	1948-02-27	Boston	Boston Symphony – Koussevitzky
Martinů, Bohuslav	Concertino for Piano and Orchestra (1938)	1948-05-08	London	Liza Fuchsová / London Symphony – Standford Robinson
McDonald, Harl	Saga of the Mississippi	1948-04-09	Philadelphia	Philadelphia Orchestra – Ormandy
Moeran, Ernest John	Serenade in G	1948-09-02	London (Proms)	London Symphony – Cameron
Mortari, Virgilio	Due salmi funebri in memoria di Alfredo Casella	1948-09-17	Venice Biennale	Bozzi Luca / [unknown ensemble] – Gracis
Myaskovsky, Nikolai	Symphony on Russian Themes (Symphony No. 26)	1948-12-28	Moscow	[unknown orchestra] – Gauk
Nabokov, Nicolas	The Return of Pushkin	1948-01-02	Boston	Koshetz / Boston Symphony – Koussevitzky
Ohana, Maurice	Trois poèmes de Saadi	1948-03-06	Paris	French Radio National Orchestra – Giardino
Piston, Walter	Symphony No. 3	1948-01-09	Boston	Boston Symphony – Koussevitzky
Rawsthorne, Alan	Symphonic Studies	1948-09-14	Venice Biennale	La Fenice Orchestra – Scherchen
Rawsthorne, Alan	Violin Concerto No. 1	1948-07-01	Cheltenham Music Festival, UK	Olof / Hallé Orchestra – Barbirolli
Rosenthal, Manuel	Christmas Symphonies	1948-12-23	Philadelphia	Philadelphia Orchestra – Ormandy
Rota, Nino	String Quartet	1948-09-15	Venice Biennale	Poltronieri Quartet
Schaeffer, Pierre	Cinq études de bruits	1948-10-05	Paris	[electronic music]
Schoenberg, Arnold	A Survivor from Warsaw	1948-11-04	Albuquerque, New Mexico	Smith / Albuquerque Civic Symphony Orchestra – Frederick
Scott, Cyril	Oboe Concerto	1948-09-13	London (Proms)	Goossens / London Symphony – Robinson
Searle, Humphrey	Fuga giocosa	1948-08-06	London (Proms)	London Symphony – Cameron
Shapero, Harold	Symphony for Classical Orchestra	1948-01-30	Boston	Boston Symphony – Bernstein
Stevens, Bernard	Fugal Overture	1948-08-13	London (Proms)	BBC Symphony – Sargent
Stravinsky, Igor	Mass for Chorus and Winds	1948-10-27	Milan	Members of the La Scala Orchestra and Chorus – Ansermet
Thomson, Virgil	Suite from Louisiana Story	1948-11-26	Philadelphia	Philadelphia Orchestra – Ormandy
Tippett, Michael	Suite in D	1948-11-15	London	BBC Symphony – Boult
Toch, Ernst	Hyperion, dramatic overture	1948-04-01	Cleveland	Cleveland Orchestra – Szell
Turchi, Guido	Music for Orchestra	1948-09-08	Venice Biennale	RAI Symphony Orchestra in Rome – Previtali
Vaughan Williams, Ralph	Symphony No. 6	1948-04-21	London (Royal Albert Hall)	BBC Symphony – Boult
Vlad, Roman	Symphony in Three Movements	1948-09-08	Venice Biennale	RAI Symphony Orchestra in Rome – Previtali

=== Compositions ===
- Yasushi Akutagawa
  - Trinita sinfonica
  - String Quartet
  - La danse for piano
- George Antheil –
  - Violin Sonata No. 4
  - String Quartet No. 3
- Pierre Boulez – Piano Sonata No. 2
- Havergal Brian – Symphony No. 7
- John Cage –
  - Sonatas and Interludes for prepared piano
  - Suite for Toy Piano
- Elliott Carter – Sonata for cello and piano
- Aaron Copland –
  - The Red Pony suite
  - Clarinet Concerto
- George Crumb – Alleluja for unaccompanied chorus
- Einar Englund – Symphony No. 2 Blackbird
- Ross Lee Finney – String Quartet No. 5
- Paul Hindemith – Suite französischer Tänze
- Vagn Holmboe – Concerto No. 11 for trumpet and orchestra (his only trumpet concerto, but once called Chamber Concerto No. 11 because of its scoring)
- Joseph Jongen – La musique for soprano, string quartet, and piano, Op. 135, No. 2
- Dmitry Kabalevsky – Violin Concerto in C major
- Bohuslav Martinů –
  - Piano Concerto No. 3
  - The Strangler (ballet)
- Toshiro Mayuzumi –
  - Divertimento, for ten instruments
  - Rumba Rhapsody for orchestra
- Nikolai Myaskovsky – Cello Sonata No. 2
- Andrzej Panufnik – Symphony No. 1 Sinfonia Rustica
- Francis Poulenc – Sonata for cello and piano, Op. 143 (1948)
- Alan Rawsthorne – Violin Concerto No. 1
- Pierre Schaeffer – Étude aux chemins de fer
- William Schuman – Symphony No. 6
- John Serry Sr. –
  - Consolation Waltz
  - Bugle Polka
- Harold Shapero – Symphony for Classical Orchestra
- Dmitri Shostakovich
  - From Jewish Folk Poetry (song cycle)
  - The Young Guard (film score)
- Richard Strauss – Four Last Songs
- Igor Stravinsky – Mass for chorus and double wind quintet
- Eduard Tubin – Double Bass Concerto
- Heitor Villa-Lobos
  - Fantasia for saxophone, three horns, and strings
  - Piano Concerto No. 2
  - Bachianas Brasileiras No.5, arranged for piano and voice
- Chris Mary Francine Whittle – Piano Concerto
- Akio Yashiro – Trio for violin, cello, and piano

== Opera ==
- Arthur Bliss – The Olympians (Premiered 1949)
- Sergei Prokofiev – The Story of a Real Man (opera, completed this year)

== Film ==
- Arnold Bax – Oliver Twist
- Brian Easdale – The Red Shoes
- Jacques Ibert – Macbeth
- Max Steiner – Key Largo
- Max Steiner – The Treasure of the Sierra Madre
- Dimitri Tiomkin – Red River
- William Walton – Hamlet
- Ralph Vaughan Williams – Scott of the Antarctic

== Musical theatre ==
- A La Carte London production
- As the Girls Go Broadway production
- Bob's Your Uncle (Frank Eyton & Noel Gay) London production opened at the Saville Theatre on May 5 and ran for 363 performances
- The Boltons Revue London production
- Cage Me a Peacock (Music: Eve Lynd Lyrics: Adam Leslie Book: Noel Langley) London production opened at the Strand Theatre on June 18 and ran for 337 performances
- Caribbean Rhapsody London production
- Carissima London production opened at the Palace Theatre on March 10 and ran for 488 performances
- Down in the Valley Broadway production
- High Button Shoes (Jule Styne and Sammy Cahn) – London production opened at the Hippodrome on December 22 and ran for 291 performances
- Imperial Violets Paris production
- Inside U.S.A. Broadway production loosely based on the book Inside U.S.A. by John Gunther. Arthur Schwartz (music) and Howard Dietz (lyrics). Opened on Broadway at the New Century Theatre on April 30, 1948, and run for 399 performances
- The Kid from Stratford London production opened at the Prince's Theatre on September 30 and ran for 235 performances
- Kiss Me, Kate (Cole Porter) – Broadway production opened on December 30 at the New Century Theatre and ran for 1077 performances
- Lend an Ear Broadway production
- Look Ma, I'm Dancin'! Broadway production
- Love Life Broadway production
- Maid to Measure London revue opened at the Cambridge Theatre on May 20. Starring Jessie Matthews, Tommy Fields, Joan Heal and Lew Parker.
- Magdalena Broadway production
- Make Mine Manhattan Broadway production
- Moonshine New Haven production
- My Romance (Sigmund Romberg and Rowland Leigh) opened at the Shubert Theatre on October 19, transferred to the Adelphi Theatre (New York) on December 7 and ran for a total of 95 performances
- Oranges And Lemons London production
- Slings And Arrows London production
- That's The Ticket Broadway production
- Where's Charley? Broadway production opened on October 11 at the St. James Theatre and ran for 792 performances

== Musical films ==
- April Showers starring Ann Sothern, Jack Carson, Robert Alda and S. Z. Sakall. Directed by James V. Kern.
- Are You With It? starring Donald O'Connor, Olga San Juan and Martha Stewart. Directed by Jack Hively.
- La Belle Meuniere
- Big City
- Bill and Coo
- Casbah starring Yvonne DeCarlo and Tony Martin.
- A Date with Judy starring Wallace Beery, Jane Powell and Elizabeth Taylor. Directed by Richard Thorpe.
- Deux Amours
- Easter Parade starring Judy Garland, Fred Astaire, Peter Lawford and Ann Miller. Directed by Charles Walter.
- The Emperor Waltz starring Bing Crosby, Joan Fontaine, Roland Culver, Richard Haydn and Lucille Watson. Directed by Billy Wilder.
- Fandango
- Feudin', Fussin' and A-Fightin' starring Donald O'Connor, Marjorie Main, Percy Kilbride and Penny Edwards. Directed by George Sherman.
- For the Love of Mary
- A Foreign Affair
- Give My Regards to Broadway
- Glamour Girl starring Virginia Grey and Gene Krupa & his Band. Directed by Arthur Dreifuss.
- The Glass Mountain
- If You Knew Susie
- The Kissing Bandit
- Ladies of the Chorus starring Adele Jergens and Marilyn Monroe
- Lulu Belle
- Luxury Liner
- Martin Block's Musical Merry Go Round
- Mary Lou
- Melody Time animated film including Johnny Appleseed and Pecos Bill
- Mexican Hayride
- Mickey
- A Miracle Can Happen
- The Miracle of the Bells
- Music Man
- On an Island with You starring Esther Williams, Peter Lawford and Jimmy Durante. Directed by Richard Thorpe.
- One Night with You
- One Sunday Afternoon starring Dennis Morgan and Janis Paige
- One Touch Of Venus released August, starring Ava Gardner, Robert Walker and Dick Haymes.
- The Paleface starring Bob Hope and Jane Russell
- The Pirate
- Rachel and the Stranger
- Romance on the High Seas
- So Dear to My Heart
- A Song Is Born starring Danny Kaye, Virginia Mayo and Benny Goodman
- Summer Holiday released on April 16 starring Mickey Rooney and Gloria DeHaven
- That Lady in Ermine starring Betty Grable and Douglas Fairbanks, Jr.
- Three Daring Daughters
- Two Guys From Texas
- Up In Central Park starring Deanna Durbin, Dick Haymes and Vincent Price. Directed by William Seiter.
- When My Baby Smiles At Me starring Betty Grable, Dan Dailey, June Havoc, Jack Oakie, James Gleason and Richard Arlen. Directed by Walter Lang.
- Words and Music
- You Were Meant for Me starring Jeanne Crain, Dan Dailey and Oscar Levant. Directed by Lloyd Bacon.

== Births ==
- January 2 – Kerry Minnear, rock keyboard player (Gentle Giant)
- January 7 – Kenny Loggins, singer-songwriter (Loggins and Messina)
- January 8 – Paul King, rock musician (Mungo Jerry)
- January 10 – Donald Fagen, singer-songwriter (Steely Dan)
- January 14 – T-Bone Burnett, record producer, artist
- January 15 – Ronnie Van Zant, singer (Lynyrd Skynyrd) (died 1977)
- January 16 – John Carpenter, film-maker and composer
- January 22 – Gilbert Levine, American conductor and academic
- January 23 – Anita Pointer (The Pointer Sisters)
- January 26 – Corky Laing, rock drummer (Mountain)
- January 27 – Kim Gardner (Ashton, Gardner and Dyke) (died 2001)
- January 31 – Joyce Moreno, Brazilian singer-songwriter
- February 1 – Rick James, American singer-songwriter and record producer (died 2004)
- February 2 – Al McKay, American guitarist and songwriter (Earth, Wind & Fire)
- February 4 – Alice Cooper, American rock singer (Alice Cooper Band)
- February 5
  - David Denny (Steve Miller Band)
  - Christopher Guest, actor and musician (This Is Spinal Tap)
- February 7 – Jimmy Greenspoon, American keyboard player (Three Dog Night)
- February 8
  - Dan Seals, American singer-songwriter and guitarist (England Dan & John Ford Coley) (died 2009)
  - Ron Tyson, American singer-songwriter (The Temptations), lead singer (The Ethics)
- February 17
  - José José (José Sosa Ortiz), Mexican Latin singer and instrumentalist (died 2019)
  - Broderick Smith, English-born Australian multi-instrumentalist (died 2023)
- February 18 – Keith Knudsen, American singer-songwriter and drummer (The Doobie Brothers, Southern Pacific) (died 2005)
- February 19 – Tony Iommi, English heavy metal lead guitarist and songwriter (Black Sabbath)
- February 28 – Geoff Nicholls, English heavy metal keyboard player (Black Sabbath) (died 2017)
- March 2 – Rory Gallagher, musician, songwriter and bandleader (died 1995)
- March 4 – Chris Squire, bassist (Yes, The Syn) (died 2015)
- March 5
  - Eddy Grant, singer-songwriter
  - Richard Hickox, conductor
- March 8 – Little Peggy March, singer
- March 9
  - Jeffrey Osborne, singer-songwriter
  - Jimmie Fadden, folk rock percussionist (Nitty Gritty Dirt Band)
  - Chris Thompson, singer & guitarist (Manfred Mann's Earth Band)
- March 12 – James Taylor, singer-songwriter
- March 17 – Fran Byrne, rock drummer (Ace)
- March 22
  - Randy Hobbs, rock bassist (The McCoys)
  - Andrew Lloyd Webber, composer
- March 24 – Lee Oskar, rock-funk harmonica player (War)
- March 25 – Michael Stanley, singer-songwriter and DJ
- March 26
  - Richard Tandy, rock keyboard player (Electric Light Orchestra) (died 2022)
  - Steven Tyler, rock singer (Aerosmith)
- March 28
  - John Evan(s), rock keyboard player (Jethro Tull)
  - Milan Williams, funk keyboard player (Commodores)
- March 30 – Jim "Dandy" Mangrum, Southern rock singer (Black Oak Arkansas)
- April 1
  - Jimmy Cliff, reggae singer
  - Simon Crowe, new wave drummer (The Boomtown Rats)
- April 4
  - Pick Withers, drummer (Dire Straits)
  - Berry Oakley, bassist (The Allman Brothers Band) (died 1972)
- April 7 – John Oates, soul singer-songwriter (Hall & Oates)
- April 9
  - Dave "Chico" Ryan, bass guitarist and singer (Sha Na Na)
  - Phil Wright, pop rock singer (Paper Lace)
- April 17 – Jan Hammer, composer, pianist and keyboard player
- April 20 – Craig Frost, rock keyboardist (Grand Funk Railroad)
- April 21 – Paul Davis, singer-songwriter (died 2008)
- April 27 – Kate Pierson (The B-52's)
- April 30 – Wayne Kramer (MC5)
- May 2 – Larry Gatlin, country singer
- May 5 – Bill Ward (Black Sabbath)
- May 6 – Mary MacGregor, singer
- May 12
  - Ivan Kral, guitarist (Patti Smith Group)
  - Steve Winwood, R&B singer (Blind Faith)
- May 15 – Brian Eno, synthesizer virtuoso and composer
- May 19
  - Tom Scott, American saxophonist, composer and bandleader
  - Grace Jones, Jamaican singer, songwriter, model, and actress
- May 21 – Leo Sayer, singer-songwriter
- May 24 – Ernst Jansz (Doe Maar)
- May 25 – Klaus Meine (Scorpions)
- May 26 – Stevie Nicks, American singer-songwriter (Fleetwood Mac)
- May 27 – Pete Sears, keyboard player (Jefferson Starship, Hot Tuna)
- May 29 – Michael Berkeley, composer and broadcaster
- May 31 – John Bonham, rock drummer (Led Zeppelin) (died 1980)
- June 16 – Nick Drake, singer-songwriter
- June 20 – Alan Longmuir, pop guitarist (Bay City Rollers) (died 2018)
- June 21 – Joey Molland, rock composer-guitarist (Badfinger)
- June 22 – Todd Rundgren, singer and producer
- June 24
  - Richard Charteris, musicologist
  - Patrick Moraz, keyboard player (Yes, The Moody Blues)
- June 25 – Kenji Sawada, rock singer-songwriter
- June 29 – Ian Paice (Deep Purple)
- July 3 – Paul Barrere (Little Feat)
- July 4 – Jeremy Spencer, guitarist (Fleetwood Mac)
- July 7 – Larry Reinhardt (Iron Butterfly)
- July 12 – Walter Egan, rock musician
- July 17 – Ron Asheton, guitarist (The Stooges)
- July 18 – Philip Harris (Ace)
- July 19 – Keith Godchaux (Grateful Dead)
- July 21 – Cat Stevens, singer-songwriter
- July 25 – Steve Goodman, folk singer-songwriter (died 1984)
- August 8 – Andy Fairweather-Low, singer (Amen Corner)
- August 10 – Patti Austin
- August 12 – Tony Santini (Sha Na Na)
- August 13 – Kathleen Battle, opera singer
- August 16 – Barry Hay (Golden Earring)
- August 19
  - Susan Jacks, pop singer (died 2022)
  - Elliot Lurie (Looking Glass)
- August 20 – Robert Plant, singer (Led Zeppelin)
- August 24 – Jean Michel Jarre, composer
- August 28 – Daniel Seraphine (Chicago)
- September 3 – Don Brewer (Grand Funk Railroad)
- September 6
  - Claydes Smith (Kool & the Gang)
  - Sam Hui, Hong Kong singer-songwriter and actor, superstar of Cantopop
- September 11 – John Martyn, singer
- September 13 – Nell Carter, US singer and actress (died 2003)
- September 14 – Fred "Sonic" Smith, American guitarist (Husband of Patti Smith) (died 1994)
- September 16 – Kenney Jones, drummer (The Faces, The Who)
- September 17 – Raphy Leavitt, Puerto Rican-American accordion player and composer (died 2015)
- September 26 – Olivia Newton-John, English-Australian singer-songwriter, actress, entrepreneur and activist (died 2022)
- September 29 – Mark Farner (Terry Knight and the Pack, Grand Funk Railroad)
- October 1 – Cub Koda (Brownsville Station)
- October 5
  - Russell Mael, American singer (Sparks, FFS)
  - Delroy Wilson, reggae artist (died 1995)
- October 8 – Johnny Ramone, guitarist (Ramones) (died 2004)
- October 10 – Cyril Neville (The Neville Brothers)
- October 12 – Rick Parfitt, rock musician (Status Quo) (died 2016)
- October 13 – Nusrat Fateh Ali Khan, Qawwali singer (died 1997)
- October 15 – Chris de Burgh, singer-songwriter
- October 19 – Patrick Simmons (The Doobie Brothers)
- October 22 – Bo Holten, composer and conductor
- October 24 – Dale Griffin, British rock drummer (Mott The Hoople, Mott, British Lions) (died 2016)
- October 28
  - Telma Hopkins (Tony Orlando and Dawn)
  - Rick Reynolds (Black Oak Arkansas)
- November 3 – Lulu, Scottish singer and actress
- November 6
  - Glenn Frey (Eagles), American singer-songwriter (died 2016)
  - Rushton Moreve (Steppenwolf), American bass guitarist
  - George Young (The Easybeats), Australian singer-songwriter
- November 16
  - Chi Coltrane, American singer-songwriter and pianist
  - Robert John "Mutt" Lange, South African record producer and songwriter
- November 20 – Martti Wallén, Finnish opera singer (died 2024)
- November 21 – Lonnie Jordan, American funk singer-songwriter (War)
- November 30 – Richard Smallwood, gospel singer-songwriter (died 2025)
- December 1 – Eric Bloom, hard rock singer-songwriter (Blue Öyster Cult)
- December 3 – Ozzy Osbourne, heavy metal singer (Black Sabbath) (husband of Sharon Osbourne and father of Kelly Osbourne and Jack Osbourne) (died 2025)
- December 4 – Southside Johnny (John Lyon), singer-songwriter
- December 10 – Jessica Cleaves (The Friends of Distinction) (died 2014)
- December 13
  - Jeff 'Skunk' Baxter, rock guitarist (The Doobie Brothers, Steely Dan)
  - Ted Nugent, singer-songwriter
- December 16 – Robert Lee Jun-fai, Hong Kong musician, younger brother of martial artist Bruce Lee
- December 17 – Jim Bonfanti, rock drummer (Raspberries)
- December 20 – Stevie Wright, singer (The Easybeats) (died 2015)
- December 21 – Samuel L. Jackson, American actor and film producer
- December 23 – Jim Ferguson, American guitarist, composer, author, educator and music journalist
- December 25 – Barbara Mandrell, country music singer–
- December 28
  - Larry Byrom, rock guitarist (Steppenwolf)
  - Mary Weiss, pop singer (The Shangri-Las) (died 2024)
- December 31
  - Stephen Cleobury, English choral conductor (died 2019)
  - Donna Summer, American soul and disco singer-songwriter, actor and painter (died 2012)

== Deaths ==
- January 8 – Richard Tauber, operatic tenor, 56 (lung cancer)
- January 15 – Jack Guthrie, popular singer, 32 (tuberculosis)
- January 21 – Ermanno Wolf-Ferrari, composer of comic operas, 72
- January 26 – Ignaz Friedman, pianist and composer, 65
- January 31 – John Arthur St. Oswald Dykes, pianist and teacher, 84
- February 21 – Frederic Lamond, pianist, 80
- February 24 – Frank T. Southwick, American composer and organist
- April 21 – Carlos López Buchardo, composer, 66
- April 24 – Manuel Ponce, composer, 65
- April 25 – Fritz Crome, composer and music writer, 68
- May 12 – Isidor Achron, Polish-American pianist and composer, 55
- May 17
  - David Evans, Welsh composer, 74
  - Olga Samaroff, American pianist and music critic, 67
- June 1 – José Vianna da Motta, pianist and composer, 80
- June 6 – Henrik Lund, lyricist, 72
- June 14 – John Blackwood McEwen, Scottish composer and educator, 80
- June 17 – Beryl Wallace, singer, dancer and actress, 35 (aviation accident)
- June 20 – George Frederick Boyle, composer, 61
- June 27 – George Templeton Strong, composer, 92
- August 10
  - Lucille Bogan, blues singer, 51 (coronary sclerosis)
  - Emmy Hennings, cabaret performer, 63
- August 13 – Elaine Hammerstein, Broadway star, 51 (car accident)
- August 20 – David John de Lloyd, composer, 65
- September 3 – Mutt Carey, jazz trumpeter, 61
- September 12 – Rupert D'Oyly Carte, impresario, 70
- September 14 – Vernon Dalhart, country singer, 65
- October 25 – Boris Fomin, Russian folk composer, 48 (tuberculosis)
- October 10 – Mary Eaton, dancer, 47 (liver failure)
- October 24 – Franz Lehár, composer, 78
- November 9 – Euphemia Allen, composer, 87
- November 12 – Umberto Giordano, composer, 81
- December 2 – Chano Pozo, percussionist, 33 (murdered)
- December 5 – Kerry Mills, US violinist and songwriter, 79
- December 10 – Francesco Bartolomeo de Leone, composer, 61
- December 14 – R. O. Morris, British composer and teacher, 62
- December 18 – William Arms Fisher, music historian, 87
- December 22 – Donald Brian, actor, dancer and singer, 71
