= Billboard Top Race Records of 1948 =

Music sales ranking

Billboard Top Race Records of 1948 is a year-end chart compiled by Billboard magazine ranking the year's top race records based on record sales. Billboard assigned point totals to each record based on its sales, much like with its weekly Best-Selling Retail Race Records chart.

"Long Gone", an instrumental by Sonny Thompson with the "Sharps and Flats" was the year's No. 1 race record with 195 points. Thompson had another instrumental record, "Late Freight", that made the year-end list at No. 13.

"Good Rocking Tonight" by Wynonie Harris finished in the No. 2 spot with 145 points. The song anticipated elements of rock and roll music and has been cited as one of the candidates for the title of the first rock and roll record.

"Tomorrow Night", a blues record by Lonnie Johnson, finished third with 129 points. The record was a remake of a 1939 version by Horace Heidt. Johson's version held the No. 1 spot on the race chart for seven weeks and crossed over to reach the No. 19 spot on the pop chart.

"Nature Boy" by King Cole, with an orchestra conducted by Frank De Vol, was the only song to be included in Billboard's year-end lists for both race and pop records. It finished at No. 11 among the year's race records and No. 14 among the pop records.

King Records led all other labels with six records on the year-end chart, followed by Miracle and Capitol with three records each.

Rank	Title	Artist(s)	Label	Points
1	"Long Gone"	Sonny Thompson	Miracle	195
2	"Good Rocking Tonight"	Wynonie Harris	King	145
3	"Tomorrow Night"	Lonnie Johnson	King	129
4	"Pretty Mama Blues"	Ivory Joe Hunter	4 Star	125
5	"I Can't Go on Without You"	Bull Moose Jackson	King	117
6	"Messin' Around"	Memphis Slim	Miracle	108
7	"My Heart Belongs to You"	Arbee Stidham	RCA Victor	97
8	"Corn Bread"	Hal Singer Sextette	Savoy	79
9	"Run Joe"	Louis Jordan	Decca	62
10	"Blues After Hours"	Pee Wee Crayton	Modern	55
11	"Nature Boy"	Nat King Cole	Capitol	47
12	"All My Love Belongs to You"	Bull Moose Jackson	King	42
13	"Late Freight"	Sonny Thompson	Miracle	41
14	"Send for Me if You Need Me"	The Ravens	National	39
14	"Am I Asking Too Much?"	Dinah Washington	Mercury	39
15	"Hop, Skip and Jump"	Roy Milton	Specialty	38
16	"King Size Papa"	Julia Lee	Capitol	34
17	"Long About Midnight"	Roy Brown	DeLuxe	32
18	"It's Too Soon to Know"	The Orioles	Natural	28
19	"It's Too Soon to Know"	Dinah Washington	Mercury	23
20	"Fine Brown Frame"	Nellie Lutcher	Capitol	20
21	"Don't Burn the Candle at Both Ends"	Louis Jordan	Decca	19
22	"Everything I Do Is Wrong"	Roy Milton	Specialty	15
23	"Bewildered"	Red Miller Trio	Bullet	12
24	"Pleasing You"	Lonnie Johnson	King	11
25	"Blues for the Red Boy"	Todd Rhodes	King	10

== See also ==
- Billboard year-end top singles of 1948
- 1948 in music
