= List of Billboard number-one R&B songs of 1948 =

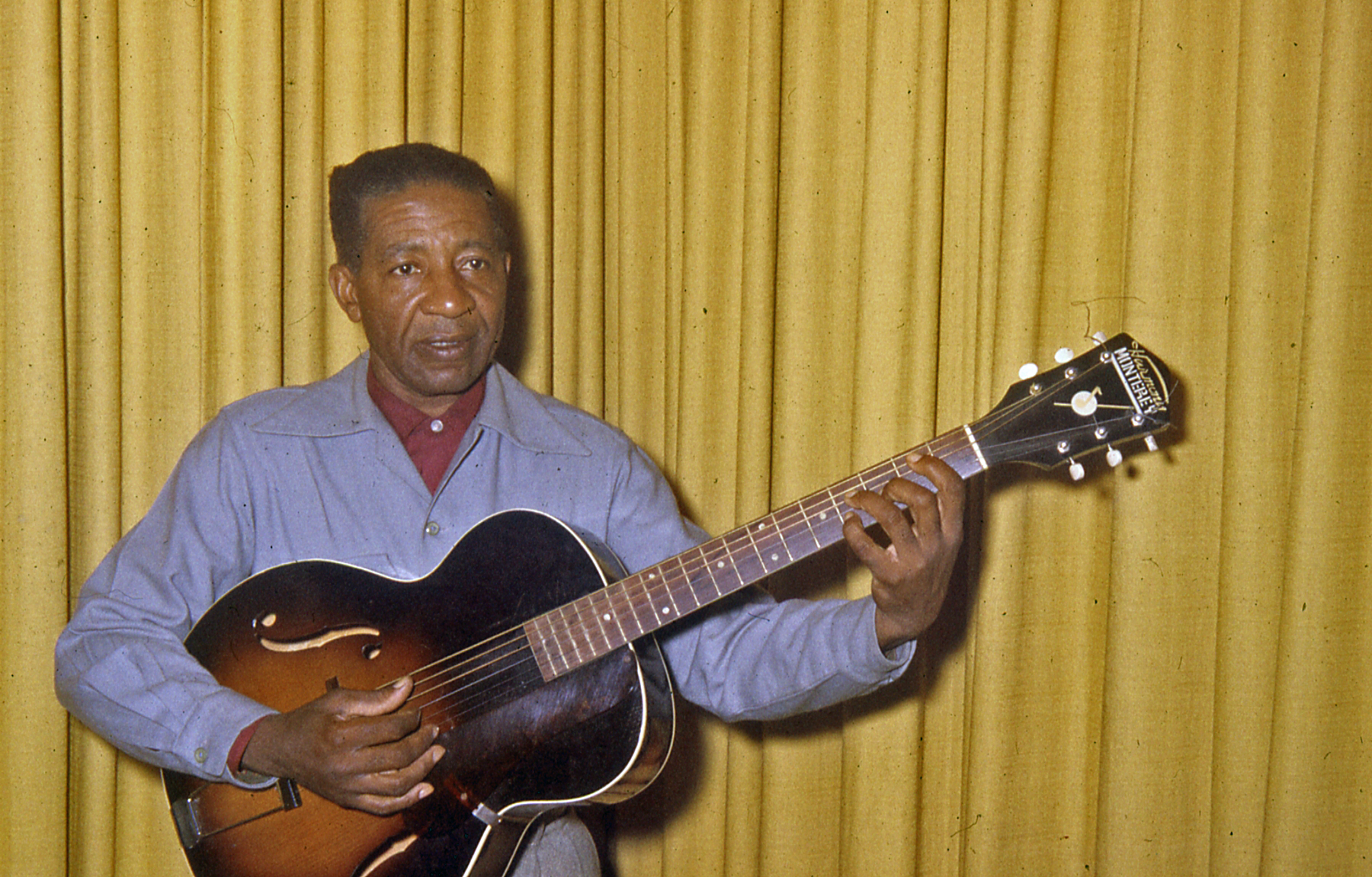
Lonnie Johnson (pictured in 1960) had the first number one on the best sellers chart.

In 1948, Billboard magazine published two charts ranking the top-performing songs in the United States within rhythm and blues (R&B) and related African-American-oriented musical genres. The Most Played Juke Box Race Records chart had been published since 1945; placings were based on a weekly survey among jukebox operators. In May, the magazine added the Best Selling Retail Race Records listing, compiled based on a survey of record stores nationwide in which the majority of customers purchased what were then referred to as "race records". The two charts are considered to be part of the lineage of the magazine's multimetric R&B chart, which since 2005 has been published under the title Hot R&B/Hip-Hop Songs.

In the issue of Billboard dated January 3, 1948, "(Opportunity Knocks But Once) Snatch and Grab It" by Julia Lee and her Boy Friends topped the jukebox chart. The song occupied the top spot for eight of the first ten weeks of 1948, spending its final week at number one in the issue dated March 6; two weeks later, Lee returned to the top of the chart with the song "King Size Papa", which had a nine-week run at number one. Lee's 17 weeks atop the jukebox chart was the most achieved by any artist in 1948, but she would not achieve another number one and her final chart entry came in 1949. In the May 22 issue, the first to feature the new best sellers chart, "Tomorrow Night" by Lonnie Johnson topped both listings.

In addition to Julia Lee, two other acts achieved two number ones in 1948. Bandleader and pianist Sonny Thompson spent two non-consecutive weeks atop both listings with "Long Gone" (Parts I & II) between July and October, and one week atop each in October with "Late Freight". The two records, both of which featured saxophonist Eddie Chamblee, were Thompson's first two chart entries, but he would never achieve another number one. Bull Moose Jackson also achieved two chart-toppers, "I Love You Yes I Do" and "I Can't Go on Without You", but like Thompson he would not return to number one. In December, two versions of the song "Bewildered" reached number one. The Red Miller Trio topped the best sellers listing in the issue dated December 4 and the jukebox chart two weeks later. In the December 25 issue Amos Milburn reached the top spot on the best sellers chart with his version, in the same week that his song "Chicken Shack Boogie" was at number one on the jukebox chart. Despite the success of Miller's version of "Bewildered", it would prove to be the only charting song of his career and little is known about his life. In June and July, Wynonie Harris topped both charts with "Good Rockin' Tonight"; the track was later recorded by Elvis Presley and is considered a historic precursor of rock and roll music.

== Chart history ==
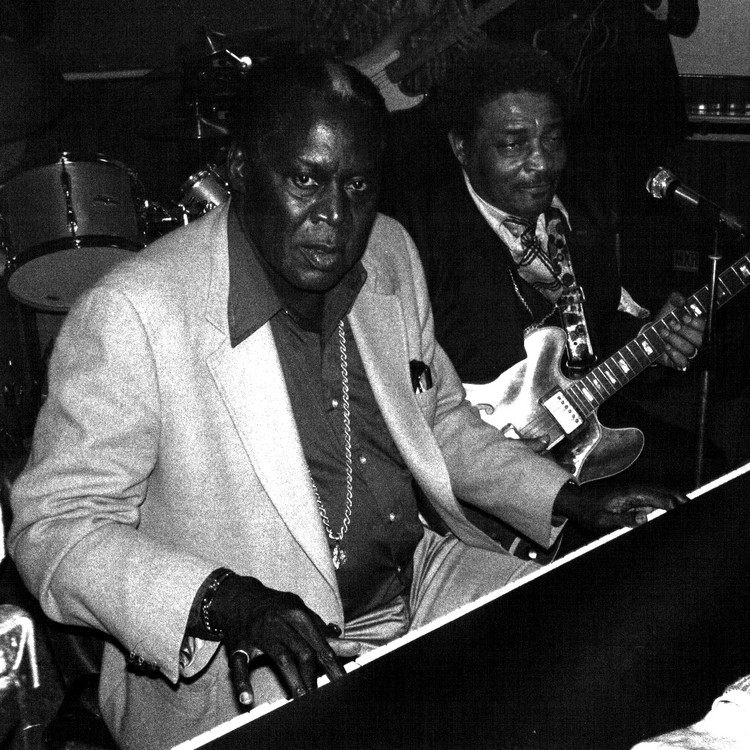
Memphis Slim (left, pictured in 1980) reached number one with "Messin' Around".

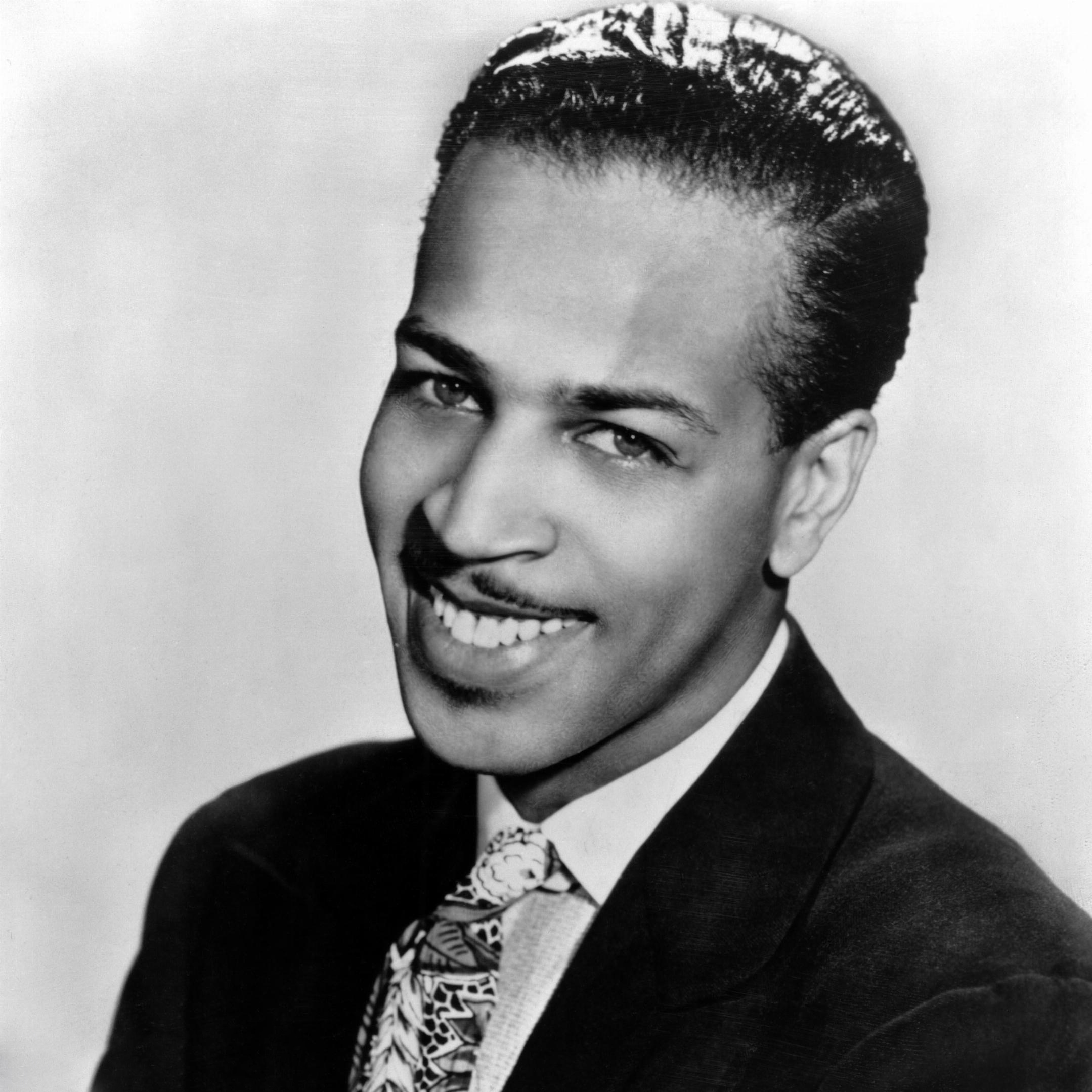
Wynonie Harris (pictured in the 1940s) had a chart-topper with "Good Rockin' Tonight".

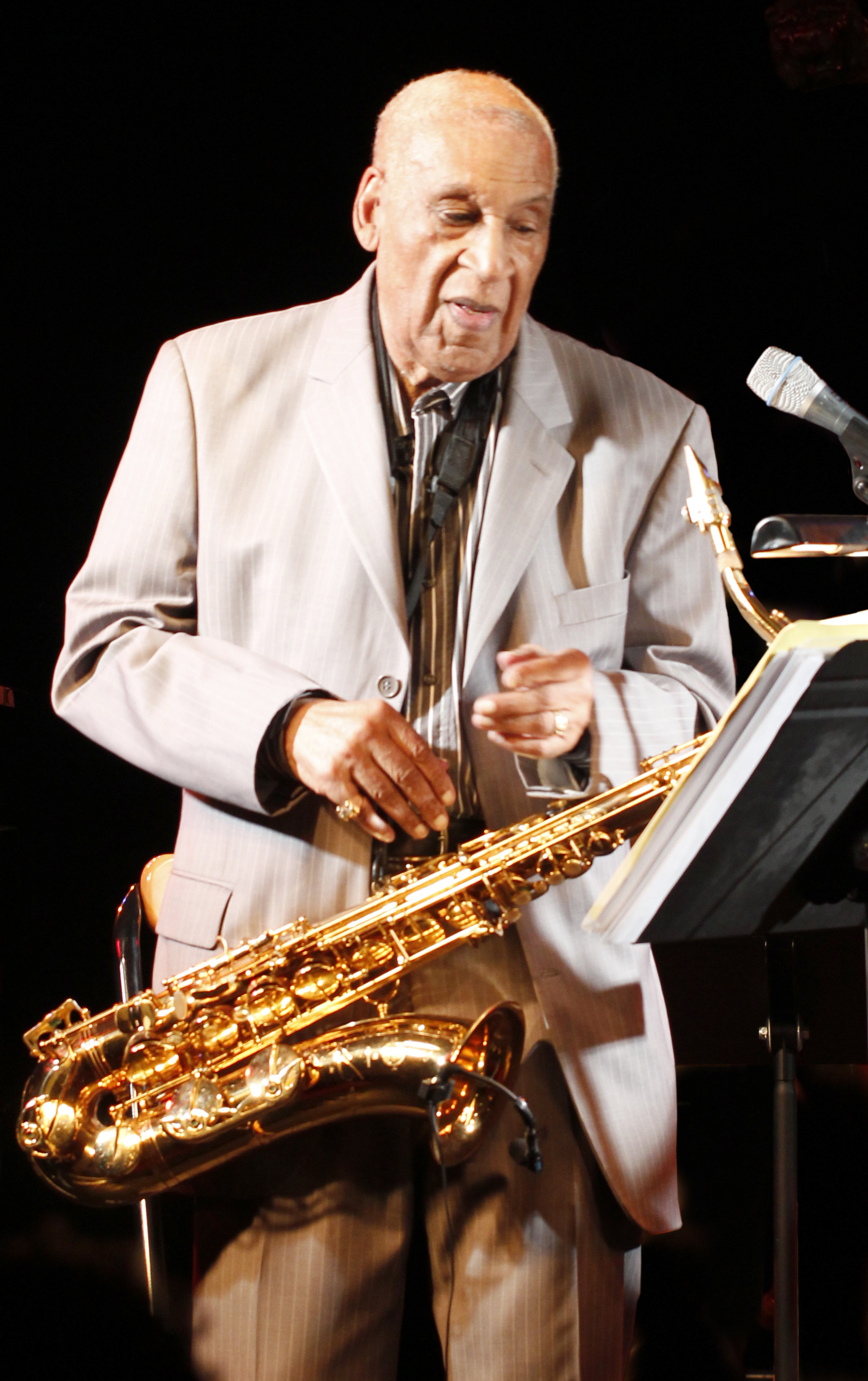
Hal Singer (pictured in 2012) led his Sextette [sic] to number one with the track "Corn Bread".

Chart history
Issue date	Juke Box		Best Sellers		Ref.
Issue date	Title	Artist(s)	Title	Artist(s)	Ref.
January 3	"(Opportunity Knocks But Once) Snatch and Grab It"	Julia Lee and her Boy Friends	—		
January 10	"(Opportunity Knocks But Once) Snatch and Grab It"	Julia Lee and her Boy Friends	—		
January 17	"(Opportunity Knocks But Once) Snatch and Grab It"	Julia Lee and her Boy Friends	—		
January 24	"(Opportunity Knocks But Once) Snatch and Grab It"	Julia Lee and her Boy Friends	—		
January 31	"(Opportunity Knocks But Once) Snatch and Grab It"	Julia Lee and her Boy Friends	—		
February 7	"(Opportunity Knocks But Once) Snatch and Grab It"	Julia Lee and her Boy Friends	—		
February 14	"(Opportunity Knocks But Once) Snatch and Grab It"	Julia Lee and her Boy Friends	—		
February 21	"I Love You Yes I Do"	Bull Moose Jackson and his Buffalo Bearcats	—		
February 28	"I Love You Yes I Do"	Bull Moose Jackson and his Buffalo Bearcats	—		
March 6	"(Opportunity Knocks But Once) Snatch and Grab It"	Julia Lee and her Boy Friends	—		
March 13	"I Love You Yes I Do"	Bull Moose Jackson and his Buffalo Bearcats	—		
March 20	"King Size Papa"	Julia Lee and her Boy Friends	—		
March 27	"King Size Papa"	Julia Lee and her Boy Friends	—		
April 3	"King Size Papa"	Julia Lee and her Boy Friends	—		
April 10	"King Size Papa"	Julia Lee and her Boy Friends	—		
April 17	"King Size Papa"	Julia Lee and her Boy Friends	—		
April 24	"King Size Papa"	Julia Lee and her Boy Friends	—		
May 1	"King Size Papa"	Julia Lee and her Boy Friends	—		
May 8	"King Size Papa"	Julia Lee and her Boy Friends	—		
May 15	"King Size Papa"	Julia Lee and her Boy Friends	—		
May 22	"Tomorrow Night"	Lonnie Johnson	"Tomorrow Night"	Lonnie Johnson	
May 29	"Tomorrow Night"	Lonnie Johnson	"Tomorrow Night"	Lonnie Johnson	
June 5	"Tomorrow Night"	Lonnie Johnson	"Tomorrow Night"	Lonnie Johnson	
June 12	"Tomorrow Night"	Lonnie Johnson	"Tomorrow Night"	Lonnie Johnson	
June 19	"Tomorrow Night"	Lonnie Johnson	"Good Rockin' Tonight"	Wynonie Harris	
June 26	"Tomorrow Night"	Lonnie Johnson	"Tomorrow Night"	Lonnie Johnson	
July 3	"Good Rockin' Tonight"	Wynonie Harris	"Tomorrow Night"	Lonnie Johnson	
July 10	"Run Joe"	Louis Jordan and his Tympany Five	"Long Gone (Parts I & II)"	Sonny Thompson	
July 17	"Tomorrow Night"	Lonnie Johnson	"Tomorrow Night"	Lonnie Johnson	
July 24	"Run Joe"	Louis Jordan and his Tympany Five	"I Can't Go on Without You"	Bull Moose Jackson and his Buffalo Bearcats	
July 31	"Long Gone (Parts I & II)"	Sonny Thompson	"I Can't Go on Without You"	Bull Moose Jackson and his Buffalo Bearcats	
August 7	"I Can't Go on Without You"	Bull Moose Jackson and his Buffalo Bearcats	"I Can't Go on Without You"	Bull Moose Jackson and his Buffalo Bearcats	
August 14	"Long Gone (Parts I & II)"	Sonny Thompson	"I Can't Go on Without You"	Bull Moose Jackson and his Buffalo Bearcats	
August 21	"I Can't Go on Without You"	Bull Moose Jackson and his Buffalo Bearcats	"I Can't Go on Without You"	Bull Moose Jackson and his Buffalo Bearcats	
August 28	"I Can't Go on Without You"	Bull Moose Jackson and his Buffalo Bearcats	"I Can't Go on Without You"	Bull Moose Jackson and his Buffalo Bearcats	
September 4	"Messin' Around"	Memphis Slim and his House Rockers	"I Can't Go on Without You"	Bull Moose Jackson and his Buffalo Bearcats	
September 11	"My Heart Belongs to You"	Arbee Stidham	"I Can't Go on Without You"	Bull Moose Jackson and his Buffalo Bearcats	
September 18	"I Can't Go on Without You"	Bull Moose Jackson and his Buffalo Bearcats	"Pretty Mama Blues"	Ivory Joe Hunter	
September 25^{[a]}	"Pretty Mama Blues"	Ivory Joe Hunter	"Pretty Mama Blues"	Ivory Joe Hunter	
September 25^{[a]}	"Messin' Around"	Memphis Slim and his House Rockers	"Pretty Mama Blues"	Ivory Joe Hunter	
October 2^{[a]}	"Corn Bread"	Hal Singer Sextette	"Pretty Mama Blues"	Ivory Joe Hunter	
October 2^{[a]}	"Late Freight"	Sonny Thompson Quintet	"Pretty Mama Blues"	Ivory Joe Hunter	
October 9	"Am I Asking Too Much"	Dinah Washington	"My Heart Belongs to You"	Arbee Stidham	
October 16	"Corn Bread"	Hal Singer Sextette	"Long Gone (Parts I & II)"	Sonny Thompson	
October 23	"Pretty Mama Blues"	Ivory Joe Hunter	"Late Freight"	Sonny Thompson Quintet	
October 30	"Corn Bread"	Hal Singer Sextette	"Long Gone (Parts I & II)"	Sonny Thompson	
November 6	"Blues After Hours"	Pee Wee Crayton	"Blues After Hours"	Pee Wee Crayton	
November 13	"Corn Bread"	Hal Singer Sextette	"Corn Bread"	Hal Singer Sextette	
November 20	"Blues After Hours"	Pee Wee Crayton	"Corn Bread"	Hal Singer Sextette	
November 27	"It's Too Soon to Know"	The Orioles	"Corn Bread"	Hal Singer Sextette	
December 4	"Chicken Shack Boogie"	Amos Milburn	"Bewildered"	Red Miller Trio	
December 11	"Blues After Hours"	Pee Wee Crayton	"Corn Bread"	Hal Singer Sextette	
December 18	"Bewildered"	Red Miller Trio	"'Long About Midnight"	Roy Brown and his Mighty Mighty Men	
December 25	"Chicken Shack Boogie"	Amos Milburn	"Bewildered"	Amos Milburn	

=== Notes ===
a. Two songs tied for number one on the Juke Box chart.
