= Miracle Records =

American R&B, blues, jazz, and gospel record label

Miracle Records was an American independent record label, established in Chicago, Illinois, United States, in 1946 to record and issue rhythm and blues, jazz and gospel music.

The company was established in August 1946 by Chicago-born businessman Lee L. Egalnick (1921–2000). It released records by musicians including Rudi Richardson, Memphis Slim, Sonny Thompson, Piney Brown, Dick Davis, Gladys Palmer, Eddie Chamblee, Al Hibbler, and Robert Anderson.

In 1948, Memphis Slim's "Messin' Around", and Sonny Thompson's "Long Gone" and "Late Freight" all made No. 1 on the US Billboard R&B chart (known at the time as the "Race Records" chart).

Egalnick left the label in 1950 to found Premium Records, and his associate Lew Simpkins soon followed, closing the label down.

The name was briefly used in 1961 by Motown Records and later by unrelated record labels in Australia and the UK during the 1970s.
