= Arbee =

Arbee may refer to:

- Arbee (automobile), a short-lived English automobile manufactured in 1904
- Arbee Stidham (1917–1988), an American R&B singer and multi-instrumentalist
- Arbee (song), a composition by Howard McGhee
