= Don't Burn the Candle at Both Ends =

Single by Louis Jordan and his Tympany Five
- Released: 1948
- Genre: Jump blues
- Length: 2:49
- Label: Decca
- Songwriter(s): Benny Carter, Irving Gordon, Louis Jordan

"Don't Burn the Candle at Both Ends" is a song written by Benny Carter, Irving Gordon, and Louis Jordan. It was performed by Louis Jordan and his Tympany Five, recorded in December 1947 and released on the Decca label (catalog no. 24483-A). The "B" side of the record was "We Can't Agree".

The song peaked at No. 4 on Billboard's race record chart. It was ranked No. 21 on the magazine's list of the top-selling race records of 1948.

== See also ==
- Billboard Top Race Records of 1948
