= I Need You So =

Song by Elvis Presley

from the album Loving You
- Released: July 1, 1957
- Recorded: February 23, 1957
- Length: 2:40
- Label: RCA Victor
- Songwriter(s): Ivory Joe Hunter

"I Need You So" is a song written and performed by Ivory Joe Hunter. His original recording of it reached number one on the Billboard R&B chart in 1950, staying there for two weeks.

== Cover versions ==
- "I Need You So" was also recorded by Elvis Presley for his 1957 album, Loving You.
- In 1965, Chuck Jackson and Maxine Brown recorded their version for the album, Saying Something.
