= Tired of Wandering =

Studio album by Arbee Stidham
- Released: 1961
- Recorded: November 7, 1960
- Studio: Van Gelder Studio, Englewood Cliffs, NJ
- Genre: Blues
- Length: 37:25
- Label: Bluesville; BVLP 1021
- Producer: Ozzie Cadena

Arbee Stidham chronology
Arbee's Blues (1961)	Tired of Wandering (1961)	A Time for Blues (1972)

Tired of Wandering. subtitled The Blues of Arbee Stidham, is an album by blues musician Arbee Stidham recorded in 1960 and released on the Bluesville label the following year.

== Reception ==
Professional ratings
Review scores
Source	Rating
AllMusic	4/5 stars
The Penguin Guide to Blues Recordings	2/4 stars

AllMusic stated: "Tired of Wandering is among his finest albums. This session, which boasts King Curtis on tenor sax, doesn't cater to blues purists; while some of the tunes have 12 bars, others don't. Regardless, the feeling of the blues enriches everything ... Stidham demonstrates that the blues can be sophisticated, polished, and jazz-influenced without losing their grit". Tony Russell in The Penguin Guide to Blues Recordings observed: "Stidham's relaxed singing seems here to reflect the manner of Lonnie Johnson. So too does his songwriting, which at the time of the recording was motivated by his belief that 'the blues have kind of taken a ballad trend. You've got to make a sweet blues, and it's got to tell a story'. As an instrumentalist though he had neither Johnson's ability nor, even as is all too embarrassingly evident, his ear".

== Track listing ==
All compositions by Arbee Stidham, except where indicated.

1. "Last Goodbye Blues" (Joe Turner) – 3:02
2. "You Can't Live in This World by Yourself" – 3:57
3. "Pawn Shop" (Brownie McGhee) – 6:57
4. "I'm Tired of Wandering" – 3:10
5. "I Wan't to Belong to You" – 3:08
6. "Wee Baby Blues" (Pete Johnson, Turner) – 5:28
7. "You Keep Me Yearning" – 2:34
8. "My Heart Will Always Belong to You" – 3:36
9. "People, What Would You Do" – 3:14
10. "Teenage Kiss" (Armond Jackson) – 2:19

== Personnel ==
=== Performers ===
- Arbee Stidham – guitar, vocals
- King Curtis – tenor saxophone
- John Wright – piano
- Leonard Gaskin – bass
- Armond Jackson – drums

=== Production ===
- Ozzie Cadena – supervision
- Rudy Van Gelder – engineer
