= Fritz Crome =

Danish composer and music writer (1879–1948)

Fritz Crome (6 May 1879 – 25 April 1948) was a Danish composer and music writer.

== Biography ==
Fritz Crome was the son of August Crome, who founded the store Crom & Goldschmidt in Copenhagen. He started an engineering course at the Danish Polytechnic (DTU), but soon switched to music. He trained as a pianist with Louis Glass and later studied in Paris and Berlin. He was then employed at the Stern Conservatory in Berlin, while he worked as a music writer, both in Germany and Scandinavia. From 1925 until his death he was employed as a teacher at the Royal Danish Academy of Music.

Cromer's musical output was relatively small and conservative. It included all the songs that were inspired by Hugo Wolf, notably.
