= Piano Concerto No. 2 (Villa-Lobos) =

- Concerto by Heitor Villa-Lobos
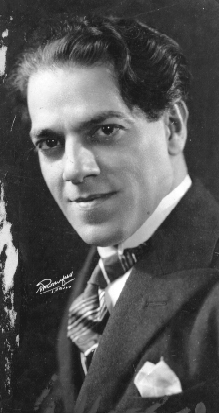
- Heitor Villa-Lobos c. 1922
- Catalogue: W487
- Composed: 1948: Paris
- Dedication: João de Souza Lima
- Published: 1979: Paris (reduction for two pianos)
- Publisher: Max Eschig
- Recorded: 1981 Krassimira Jordan, piano; Orchestra Sinfônica do Theatro Municipal; Mário Tavares, cond. (issued 1981 on LP, Tapecar MVL 029, matrix ARL.66 and ARL.67).
- Duration: 22 min
- Movements: Four
- Scoring: piano; orchestra

Premiere
- Date: 20 April 1950
- Location: Theatro Municipal, Rio de Janeiro
- Conductor: Heitor Villa-Lobos
- Performers: João de Souza Lima, piano; Orchestra Sinfônica do Theatro Municipal

The Piano Concerto No. 2, W487, is a piano concerto by the Brazilian composer Heitor Villa-Lobos, written in 1948. A typical performance lasts about 28 minutes.

Villa-Lobos composed his Second Piano Concerto in Rio de Janeiro in 1948. The score is dedicated to João de Souza Lima, who gave the first performance on 21 April 1950 at the Theatro Municipal in Rio de Janeiro, with the Orquestra Sinfônica do Theatro Municipal, conducted by the composer.

== Instrumentation ==
The work is scored for solo piano and an orchestra consisting of piccolo, 2 flutes, 2 oboes, cor anglais, 2 clarinets, bass clarinet, 2 bassoons, contrabassoon, 4 horns, 3 trumpets, 3 tenor trombones, tuba, percussion (timpani, tam-tam, cymbal, and bass drum), celesta, harp, and strings.

== Analysis ==
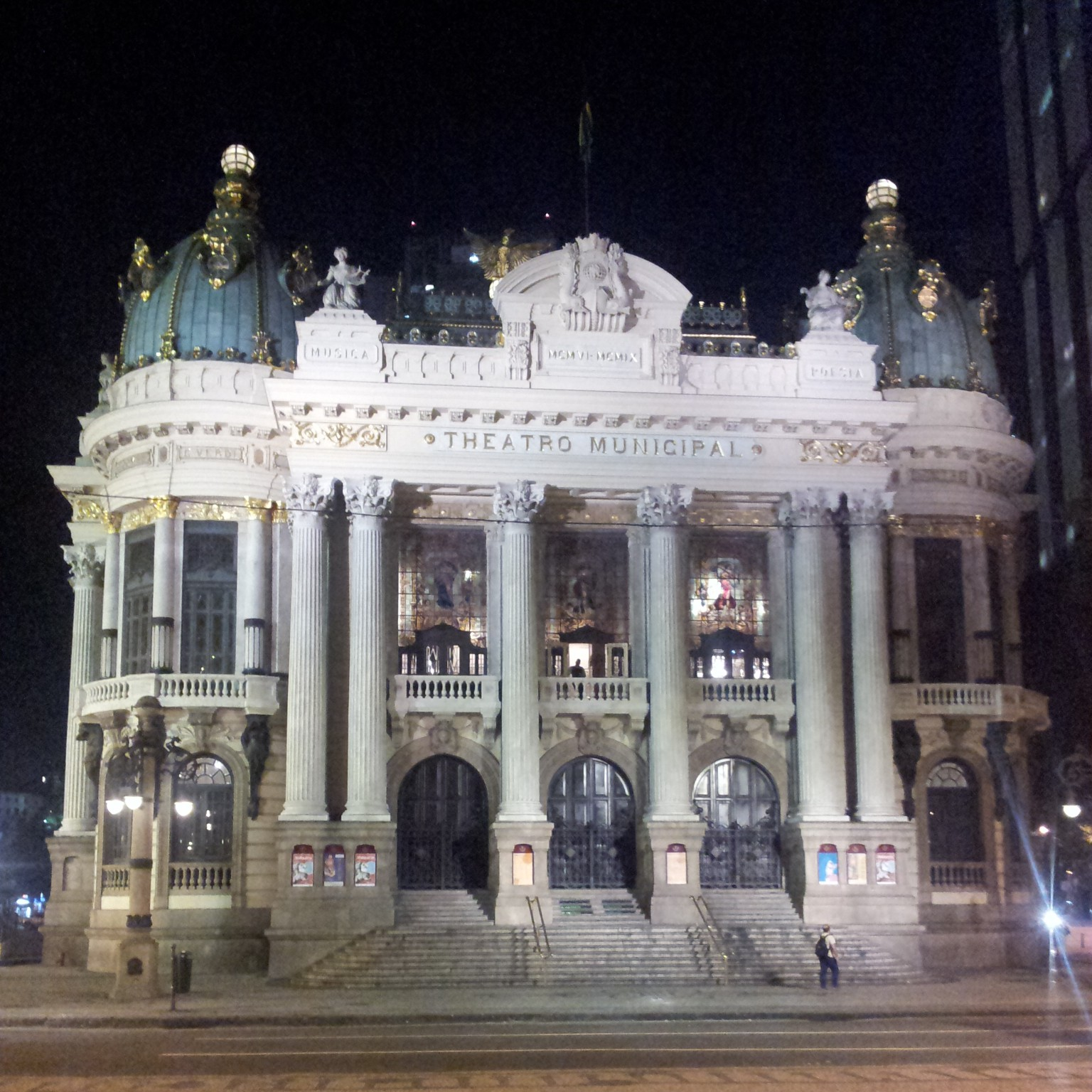
Theatro Municipal, Rio de Janeiro, venue of the concerto's première

The concerto has four movements:

1. Vivo
2. Lento
3. Quasi allegro – Cadenza
4. Allegro

In the first movement, the solo part emphasizes parallel chord movements in both hands. The main theme has a modal colouring, and irregular metres occur throughout the movement.

The second movement has been described as "a sticky, humid nocturne furnished with a lush orchestral carpet, above which the piano leaps and tumbles through a remote harmonic maze of augmented fourths and tritones [sic]".

The third movement is entirely taken up with a cadenza for the soloist, while the scherzo-finale has an energetic, Mediterranean-tinged first theme and a lyrical central section in the manner of a Brazilian modinha .

== Discography ==
- Festival Villa-Lobos 1981; II Concurso Internacional de Piano: Obras de Villa-Lobos. Ciclo Brasileiro: "Impressões Seresteiras"; A Prole do bebê No. 2: "O Boizinho de Chumbo (Luiz Henrique Senise, piano); A Prole do bebê No. 2: "A Baratinha de papel" and "O Ursozinho de algodão"; Homenagem a Chopin (Maria Chaves, piano); Piano Concerto No. 2 (Krassimira Jordan, piano; Orquestra Sinfônica do Teatro Municipal do Rio de Janeiro, conducted by Mário Tavares). Recorded during performances at the Sala CeciÌlia Meireles and the Teatro Municipal do Rio de Janeiro. LP recording. Tapecar MVL 029. [Brazil]: Tapecar, 1981.
- Heitor Villa-Lobos: 5 concertos para piano e orquestra. Fernando Lopes, piano; Orquestra Sinfônica Municipal de Campinas; conducted by Benito Juarez. Recorded 18–24 June, 1984, in the Teatro Interno do Centro de Covivência Cultural da Campinas. LP recording, 4 discs: 12 inch, 33⅓ rpm, stereo. Energia de São Paulo: LPVL 01/25 – LPVL 04/25. São Paulo: Energia de São Paulo, [1984?].
- Heitor Villa-Lobos: Five Piano Concertos. Cristina Ortiz, piano; Royal Philharmonic Orchestra, conducted by Miguel Ángel Gómez Martínez. Recorded at the Walthamstow Assembly Hall in October 1989, January and July 1990. 2-CD set: stereo. London 430 628-2 (430 629-2 and 430 630-2). London: The Decca Record Company Limited, 1992.
- Heitor Villa-Lobos: Cinco Conciertos para Piano y Orquesta. Elvira Santiago, piano (Concerto No. 1); Ulises Hernández, piano (Concerto No. 2); Patricio Malcolm, piano (Concerto No. 3); Harold López-Nussa, piano (Concerto No. 4); Roberto Urbay, piano (Concerto No. 5); Orquesta Sinfónica Nacional de Cuba, conducted by Enrique Pérez Mesa. Concerto No. 2 recorded at the Teatro Auditorium Amadeo Roldán, Havana, Cuba, 10 December 2003, part of the XXV Festival Internacional del Nuevo Cine Latinoamericano. 2 CDs + 1 DVD. Colibrí DVD/CD 050. Havana: Colibrí, 2006.
