= Run Joe =

Single by Louis Jordan and his Tympany Five
- Released: 1948
- Genre: Calypso
- Length: 3:27
- Label: Decca
- Songwriter(s): Joe Willoughby, Louis Jordan, Walt Merrick

"Run Joe" is a calypso song written by Joe Willoughby, Louis Jordan, and Walt Merrick. It was performed by Louis Jordan and his Tympany Five with vocal chorus by The Calypso Boys. It was recorded in April 1947 and released on the Decca label (catalog no. 24448-A). The "B" side of the record was "All for the Love of Lil".

The song peaked at No. 1 on Billboard's race record chart and No. 23 on the pop chart. It was ranked No. 9 on the magazine's list of the top-selling race records of 1948.

== See also ==
- Billboard Top Race Records of 1948
