= The Second International Congress of Composers and Music Critics 1948 =

The Second International Congress of Composers and Music Critics was held in Prague between May 20 and May 29, 1948, and was an important moment in the development of musical life in post-war Czechoslovakia. It was also a significant intervention in the debate over the state of modern music, and was frequently referred to in subsequent writings on the subject of the relationship between music and political and social change. The conference was organised by the Syndicate of Czech Composers, which was founded on 20 February 1946, and had also arranged the spring music festival known as Prague Spring International Music Festival since 1946, and the First Congress of Composers and Music critics. The Proclamation of the Conference later became known as 'The Prague Manifesto'

The conference was attended by around 70 musicians, composers, and music critics from 14 countries, including the British composers Alan Bush and Bernard Stevens. It was also attended by the German composer and philosopher Hanns Eisler who delivered a lecture on 'Basic Social Questions of Modern Music'. He declared that

"After all the excesses and experiments, it appears today to be the job of music of our time to lead music back to a higher form of society, to lead it back from the private to the universal"

The Conference aimed to offer solutions to what participants saw a crisis in modern music. Problems were summed up under three headings

- 'The Structure and Expression of Modern Music'
- 'Functions of Serious and Light Music'
- 'Problems of Music criticism Today'

The Prague Manifesto offered a set of principles for composers, which involved avoiding extreme subjectivism and allying themselves more closely with their national cultures. It also called for composers to focus on music that could have concrete content, such as opera, oratorio, and songs. Although the proclamation echoes the 1948 Conference of Composers in the Soviet Union, and the Zhdanov Doctrine, the notion that the Soviet delegates dictated the outcome has been challenged.

The Prague Manifesto forced thinkers outside Czechoslovakia to confront aesthetic and ideological issues. It was criticised by Theodor Adorno in his Die Gengangelte Musik. It was also discussed by Sartre in his introduction to Rene Leibowitz' 'The Artist and His conscience'. Sartre described the Prague Manifesto as "the stupid and extreme consequence of a perfectly defensible theory of art, and one that does not necessarily imply an aesthetic authoritarianism"
