= Red Miller (singer) =

Red Miller (May 5, 1914, Atlanta, Georgia – October 13, 1987) was an American R&B singer, who had a No. 1 R&B chart hit in 1948 with "Bewildered".

Few biographical details of Miller seem to be available. The record, on the Bullet label, featured Miller backed by Lloyd Glenn (piano), Tiny Webb (guitar), Ralph Hamilton (bass) and Robert Harvey (drums). It reached No. 1 on the R&B chart in December 1948, and stayed there for five weeks, for some of that time tied with a version of the same song by Amos Milburn.

Miller later recorded with Tiny Bradshaw for King Records, and with Emmitt Slay for Savoy, but soon disappeared into obscurity.
