= Corn Bread (instrumental) =

1948 instrumental by the Hal Singer Sextette

Single by Hal Singer Sextette
- Released: 1948
- Recorded: 1948
- Genre: Rhythm and blues
- Label: Savoy Records
- Songwriter: Hal Singer

"Corn Bread" is a 1948 instrumental by the Hal Singer Sextette. The single recorded on the Savoy Record Label was Hal Singer's debut on the R&B charts and the song went to number one on that chart.
