= My Heart Belongs to You =

1948 single by Arbee Stidham

"My Heart Belongs to You" is a 1948 song by Arbee Stidham. The single spent six months on the US Billboard R&B chart, reaching the number one position for one week. "My Heart Belongs to You" was Stidham's only hit on the chart.
