= King Size Papa =

1948 song by Julia Lee and Her Boy Friends

Single by Julia Lee
- B-side: "When You're Smiling"
- Released: January 26, 1948
- Recorded: November 11, 1947
- Genre: Dirty blues
- Label: Capitol Records
- Songwriter(s): Benny Carter, Paul Vandervoort II
- Producer(s): Dave Dexter Jr.

"King Size Papa" is a 1948 dirty blues ("hokum") song by Julia Lee and Her Boy Friends. The Lee's eighth single, penned by Benny Carter (working under a pseudonym Johnny Gomez due to the risqué material of the song) and Paul Vance (Paul Vandervoort II), was recorded on November 11, 1947 and released on the Capitol Americana label under #40082. The song entered the charts on February 14, 1948 and peaked at number one on the US Billboard R&B chart. The song, written in the verse-and-refrain twelve-bar blues form, stayed in the first place for more than two months, in the charts for six, crossed over to the pop chart (peaked at number 15), and remains Lee's most-remembered song. With sensuality being at the core of Lee's style (during the November 1947 recording session, according to the record producer Dave Dexter Jr., "she came across on shellac like a bitch in heat"), the song is still being selected as one of the few top sexually risqué ones in the 21st century.

The text of this song, intended for a broad audience, is overtly sexual, as was typical for African-American songs of the post-war decade. Julia Lee (on vocals and piano) and Her Boy Friends (including Benny Carter himself on alto saxophone, Dave Cavanaugh on tenor saxophone, Vic Dickenson on trombone) in this "salacious and fun" song create images of objects of great size, length, or height to titillate both the white and black listeners, although the song is not as suggestive as one would expect from the title. While the topic was not new (cf. "It's Too Big Poppa" by Claude Hopkins in 1945), the slightly mocking vocals and Carter's saxophone solo assured the amusement.

== In popular culture ==
- In the late 1990s and early 2000s, the song was used by Pillsbury in its "Grands! biscuits" television commercials; its double entendre lyrics served to describe the atypically large size of the product.
- A version of this song was also used in the 1999 Eddie Murphy and Martin Lawrence comedy film, Life.

== Sources ==
- Sullivan, Steve (17 May 2017). "King Size Papa (1948) - Julia Lee and Her Boy Friends". Encyclopedia of Great Popular Song Recordings, Volume 3. Rowman & Littlefield. p. 209. ISBN 978-1-4422-5449-7. OCLC 1003253612.
- Birnbaum, Larry (2013). Before Elvis: The Prehistory of Rock 'n' Roll. Rowman & Littlefield. p. 286. ISBN 978-0-8108-8638-4. OCLC 1058131066.
- Millar, Bill (1999). "Kansas City Stars. Part 1. Julia Lee". In Colin Escott (ed.). All Roots Lead to Rock: Legends of Early Rock 'n' Roll. Schirmer Books. pp. 27–42. ISBN 978-0-02-864866-8. OCLC 1022595608.
- Hansen, Barry (1967). Negro Popular Music, 1945-1953 (MA). Hansen. OCLC 2283108.
- Berger, Morroe; Berger, Edward; Patrick, James S. (2001). Morroe Berger (ed.). Benny Carter: A Life in American Music, Volume 1 (2 ed.). Scarecrow Press. p. 486. ISBN 978-0-8108-4111-6. OCLC 1004585599.
- Russell, Thaddeus. (2008). "The Color of Discipline: Civil Rights and Black Sexuality". American Quarterly. 60 (1): 101–128. doi:10.1353/aq.2008.0000. eISSN 1080-6490.
- Cooper, B. Lee (29 October 2013). "Audio Reviews: The Road to Rock & Roll—Volume One: Jitterbug Jive". Rock Music Studies. 1 (2): 200–203. doi:10.1080/19401159.2013.846664. eISSN 1940-1167. ISSN 1940-1159.
