= Tomorrow Night (Coslow and Grosz song) =

1948 single by Lonnie Johnson

Song
- Released: 1939
- Songwriters: Sam Coslow, Will Grosz

"Tomorrow Night"

Single by Lonnie Johnson
- B-side: "What a Woman"
- Released: February 1948
- Genre: blues
- Label: King
- Songwriters: Sam Coslow and Will Grosz

"Tomorrow Night" is a 1939 song written by Sam Coslow and Will Grosz. A version by Horace Heidt and His Musical Knights (vocal by The Heidtlites) was very popular in 1939.

In 1948, Lonnie Johnson had a crossover hit on King Records (Johnson had also previously recorded the song for Paradise records in 1947) with the song, which had Johnson on guitar and Simeon Hatch on piano. Lonnie Johnson's version hit number one on the R&B charts for seven non consecutive weeks and peaked at number nineteen on the pop chart. Actually, the Paradise and King recordings are the same basic recording, however King Records overdubbed a vocal chorus over the original Paradise version, and it's the overdubbed recording that became the hit. A "stereo" version is known to exist where the Paradise basic track is heard on the left channel and the overdubbed version with the chorus is heard on the right channel

Lonnie Johnson's version of "Tomorrow Night" would become his theme song and transformed the song into a blues standard.

== Other versions ==
- Ben Bernie and His Orchestra (vocal by Don Saxon) - recorded for Vocalion Records (catalog No. 5072) on August 24, 1939.
- Jimmy Dorsey and His Orchestra (vocal by Bob Eberly) recorded November 3, 1939 for Decca Records (catalog No. 2837A).
- Patti Page recorded the song in 1948 for Mercury Records (catalog No. 5153).
- Elvis Presley - recorded September 10, 1954 for Sun Records but not released. The original Sun master was overdubbed with new instrumental and vocal backing by producer Chet Atkins and the track was included in the album Elvis for Everyone! (1965).
- Lavern Baker & the Gliders - recorded for Atlantic Records (catalog No. 1047) in 1954.
- Jerry Lee Lewis also recorded the song during his time at Sun Records.
- Pat Boone - included in his album Pat (1957).
- Brook Benton - for his album Singing the Blues – Lie to Me (1962).
- Charlie Rich recorded the song during his RCA era in 1964.
- Bob Dylan - on his 1992 album Good as I Been to You.
- Patty Griffin - on her 2002 album 1000 Kisses.
- Tom Jones - on his 2012 album Long Lost Suitcase.
