= I Can't Go on Without You =

1948 Song by Bull Moose Jackson and His Buffalo Bearcats

"I Can't Go on Without You" is a 1948 song by Bull Moose Jackson and His Buffalo Bearcats. The song was composed by Henry Glover and Sally Nix. The single was Jackson's most successful release on the US Billboard R&B chart, reaching number one for eight weeks.

== See also ==
- List of Billboard number-one R&B singles of the 1940s
