= Blues After Hours =

Instrumental by Pee Wee Crayton

Single by Pee Wee Crayton
- B-side: "I'm Still in Love with You"
- Released: October 1948
- Recorded: Los Angeles, 1948
- Genre: Blues
- Length: 2:28
- Label: Modern
- Songwriter: Pee Wee Crayton

Pee Wee Crayton singles chronology
"Blues After Hours" (1948)	"Texas Hop" (1948)

"Blues After Hours" is a 1948 instrumental by West Coast blues guitarist Pee Wee Crayton. Released by Modern Records, it was his first single and the most successful of his three chart entries. "Blues After Hours" went to the number one spot on the Billboard magazine's Race Records charts.

According to Crayton, "Blues After Hours" was inspired by T-Bone Walker and developed while he was playing at the New Orleans Swing Club in San Francisco. During his first recording session for Jules Bihari, Crayton began to play the song and Bihari decided to record it. Crayton protested, saying that the song was unfinished. Bihari countered: "Play anything." "So I started playing and ideas just came. I was making T-Bone's stuff into what little I knew. That turned out to be one of the biggest records I ever had."

Backing Crayton on guitar are: Buddy Floyd on tenor saxophone, David Lee Johnson on piano, Bill Davis on bass, Candy Johnson on drums, plus additional unidentified musicians. Billy Vera calls "Blues After Hours" "a barely disguised takeoff on 'After Hours'", a 1940 instrumental by Erskine Hawkins and His Orchestra (Bluebird 10879), although Crayton's song features electric guitar, whereas the earlier song does not.
