= Ivory Joe Hunter =

American singer-songwriter (1914–1974)

Background information
- Also known as: The Baron of the Boogie; The Happiest Man Alive
- Born: October 10, 1914; Kirbyville, Texas, United States
- Died: November 8, 1974 (aged 60) Memphis, Tennessee, United States
- Genres: R&B, blues, boogie-woogie, country
- Occupations: Singer-songwriter
- Instruments: Piano, vocals
- Years active: 1933–1974

Ivory Joe Hunter (October 10, 1914 – November 8, 1974) was an American rhythm-and-blues singer, songwriter, and pianist. After a series of hits on the US R&B chart starting in the mid-1940s, he became more widely known for his hit recording "Since I Met You Baby" (1956). He was billed as The Baron of the Boogie, and also known as The Happiest Man Alive. His musical output ranged from R&B to blues, boogie-woogie, and country music, and Hunter made a name in all of those genres. Uniquely, he was honored at both the Monterey Jazz Festival and the Grand Ole Opry.

== Early years ==
Hunter was born in Kirbyville, Texas. Ivory Joe was his given name, not a nickname nor a stage name. According to Hunter, when he was born his parents thought he "looked just like the baby on the outside of the Castoria Ivory bottle, so they called [him] Ivory."

As a youngster in a large family of musicians, he developed an early interest in music. His father, Dave Hunter, played guitar, and his mother sang gospel. Hunter was a talented pianist by the age of 13, playing in school orchestras.

He graduated high school in 1930 and made his first recording for Alan Lomax and the Library of Congress as a teenager, in 1933.

Hunter was the uncle of Rick Stevens, the original lead vocalist for Tower of Power.

== Radio and recordings ==
In the early 1940s, Hunter had his own radio show in Beaumont, Texas, on KFDM, for which he eventually became program manager. In 1942 he moved to Los Angeles, joining Johnny Moore's Three Blazers in the mid-1940s. He wrote and recorded his first song, "Blues at Sunrise", with the Three Blazers for his own label, Ivory Records, it became a nationwide hit on the R&B chart in 1945 when re-released on Exclusive.

In the late 1940s, Hunter founded Pacific Records. In 1947, he recorded for 4 Star Records and King Records. Two years later, he recorded further R&B hits; on "I Quit My Pretty Mama" and "Guess Who" he was backed by members of Duke Ellington's band.

After signing with MGM Records, he recorded "I Almost Lost My Mind", which topped the 1950 R&B charts and would later (in the wake of Hunter's success with "Since I Met You Baby") be recorded by Pat Boone, whose version became a number one pop hit. "I Need You So" was a number two R&B hit that same year. With his smooth delivery, Hunter became a popular R&B artist, and he also began to be noticed in the country music community. In April 1951, he made his network TV debut on You Asked for It. He toured widely with a backing band and became known for his large build (he was 6 feet 4 inches tall), his brightly colored stage suits, and his volatile temperament.

By 1954, he had recorded more than 100 songs and moved to Atlantic Records. His first song to cross over to the pop charts was "Since I Met You Baby" (1956). It was to be his only Top 40 pop song, reaching number 12 on the pop chart.

While visiting Memphis, Tennessee, in the spring of 1957, Hunter was invited by Elvis Presley to visit Graceland. The two spent the day together, singing "I Almost Lost My Mind" and other songs together. Hunter commented, "He is very spiritually minded... he showed me every courtesy, and I think he's one of the greatest." Presley recorded several of his songs, including "I Need You So", "My Wish Came True" and "Ain't That Lovin' You, Baby". Later, Presley would record "I Will Be True" and "It's Still Here" in May 1971. Hunter was a prolific songwriter, and some estimate he wrote more than 7,000 songs.

== Country comeback ==
Hunter's "Empty Arms" and "Yes I Want You" also made the pop charts, and he had a minor hit with "City Lights" in 1959, just before his popularity began to decline. Hunter came back as a country singer in the late 1960s, making regular Grand Ole Opry appearances and recording an album titled I've Always Been Country.

The country singer Sonny James issued a version of "Since I Met You Baby", which topped the country charts in 1969, paving the way for Hunter's album The Return of Ivory Joe Hunter and his appearance at the Monterey Jazz Festival. The album was recorded in Memphis with a band that included Isaac Hayes, Gene "Bowlegs" Miller and Charles Chalmers. Jerry Lee Lewis recorded a cover version of the song in 1969.

== Death ==
Hunter died of complications due to lung cancer in 1974, at the age of 60, in Memphis, Tennessee. His remains were buried in Spring Hill Community Cemetery.

== Singles ==
Year	Single (A-side, B-side) Both sides from same album except where indicated	Chart Positions		Album
Year	Single (A-side, B-side) Both sides from same album except where indicated	US Pop	US R&B	Album
1945	"Blues at Sunrise" b/w "You Taught Me to Love (But Not to Forget)"	—	3	Non-album tracks
1946	"Seventh Street Boogie" b/w "Reconversion Blues" (non-album track)	—	—	Ivory Joe Hunter (Sound Record Co.)
1946	"Boogin' in the Basement" b/w "Don't Leave Me"	—	—	Non-album tracks
1946	"Ivory Joe's Boogie" b/w "Gazing"	—	—	Non-album tracks
1946	"We're Gonna Boogie" b/w "Heavy Hearted Blues" (non-album track)	—	—	Ivory Joe Hunter (Sound Record Co.)
1946	"Are You Hep?" b/w "I Love My Man" (both with vocal by Aurelia Joyner)	—	—	Non-album tracks
1947	"Pretty Mama Blues" b/w "I Don't Want No Cheese No More" (non-album track)	—	1	Ivory Joe Hunter (Sound Record Co.)
1947	"Blues at Midnight" b/w "High Cost, Low Pay Blues" (non-album track)	—	—	Ivory Joe Hunter (Sound Record Co.)
1947	"Mean Woman Blues" b/w "Jamin' Down in Town" (from Ivory Joe Hunter (Sound Record Co.))	—	—	Mean Woman Blues
1947	"San Francisco Blues" b/w "Don't Be No Fool — Fool"	—	—	Non-album tracks
1948	"Don't Fall in Love with Me" b/w "Siesta with Sonny" (non-album track)	—	8	Sixteen of His Greatest Hits
1948	"Pretty Mama Blues" b/w "Are You Hep?" (non-album track)	—	—	Ivory Joe Hunter (Sound Record Co.)
1948	"What Did You Do to Me" b/w "The Code Song (I Love You)" (from Sixteen of His Greatest Hits)	—	9	Non-album track
1948	"Blues at Midnight" b/w "I Love My Man" (non-album track)	—	—	Ivory Joe Hunter (Sound Record Co.)
1948	"I Like It" b/w "No Money, No Luck Blues"	—	14	Sixteen of His Greatest Hits
1949	"Waiting in Vain" b/w "That's the Gal for Me" (non-album track)	—	5	Sixteen of His Greatest Hits
1949	"Blues at Midnight" b/w "I Love My Man"	—	10	Ivory Joe Hunter (Sound Record Co.)
1949	"Guess Who" /	—	2	Sixteen of His Greatest Hits
1949	"Landlord Blues"	—	6	Non-album track
1949	"Jealous Heart" b/w "All States Boogie" (non-album track)	—	2	Sixteen of His Greatest Hits
1949	"Seventh Street Boogie" b/w "Please Come Back Home Baby"	—	—	Ivory Joe Hunter (Sound Record Co.)
1950	"I Almost Lost My Mind" b/w "If I Give You My Love" (non-album track)	—	1	I Get That Lonesome Feeling
1950	"I Quit My Pretty Mama" b/w "It's You Just You"	—	4	Sixteen of His Greatest Hits
1950	"Don't Leave Me"; B-side by Cecil Gant Trio: "Coming Round the Mountain"	—	—	Non-album tracks
1950	"S.P. Blues" b/w "Why Fool Yourself" (from I Need You So)	—	9	Non-album tracks
1950	"Let Me Dream" b/w "Gimme a Pound o' Ground Round"	—	—	Non-album tracks
1950	"I Need You So" b/w "Leave Her Alone" (non-album track)	—	1	I Get That Lonesome Feeling
1950	"Please Don't Cry Anymore" b/w "I Got Your Water On" (non-album track)	—	—	Sixteen of His Greatest Hits
1950	"She's a Killer"; B-side by Nick Esposito, "Empty Room Blues"	—	—	Non-album tracks
1950	"Changing Blues" b/w "I Have No Reason to Complain"	—	—	Sixteen of His Greatest Hits
1950	"Old Man's Boogie" b/w "Living a Lie"	—	—	Non-album tracks
1950	"It's a Sin" b/w "Don't You Believe Her"	—	10	Non-album tracks
1950	"Lying Woman" b/w "Too Late"	—	—	Sixteen of His Greatest Hits
1950	"Sorta Need You" b/w "You Thrill Me" (from I Need You So)	—	—	Non-album track
1951	"False Friend Blues" b/w "Send Me, Pretty Mama" (non-album track)	—	—	Sixteen of His Greatest Hits
1951	"I Found My Baby" b/w "I Ain't Got No Gal No More" (non-album track)	—	—	I Get That Lonesome Feeling
1951	"Grieving Blues" b/w "Big Wig" (from Ivory Joe Hunter, Sound Record Co.)	—	—	Non-album tracks
1951	"Is My Pop There?" b/w "Time Has Passed"	—	—	Non-album tracks
1951	"When I Lost You" b/w "You Lied" (non-album track)	—	—	I Get That Lonesome Feeling
1951	"I'm Yours Until Eternity" b/w "Wrong Woman Blues" (from I Need You So)	—	—	Non-album track
1951	"Boogin' in the Rain" b/w "I Shouldn't Love You"	—	—	Ivory Joe Hunter (Sound Record Co.)
1952	"Blue Moon" b/w "U Name It" (non-album track)	—	—	I Get That Lonesome Feeling
1952	"I Thought I Had Loved (Until I Met You)" b/w "I Get That Lonesome Feeling"	—	—	I Get That Lonesome Feeling
1955	"It May Sound Silly" b/w "I Got to Learn to Do the Mambo"	—	14	Ivory Joe Hunter (Atlantic)
1955	"Heaven Came Down to Earth" b/w "I Want Somebody"	—	—	Ivory Joe Hunter (Atlantic)
1956	"A Tear Fell" b/w "I Need You by My Side"	—	15	Ivory Joe Hunter (Atlantic)
1956	"That's Why I Dream" b/w "You Mean Everything to Me"	—	—	Ivory Joe Hunter (Atlantic)
1956	"Since I Met You Baby" b/w "You Can't Stop This Rocking and Rolling"	12	1	Ivory Joe Hunter (Atlantic)
1957	"Empty Arms" /	43	2	Non-album tracks
1957	"Love's a Hurting Game"	—	7	Non-album tracks
1957	"She's Gone" b/w "Everytime I Hear That Song"	—	—	Non-album tracks
1957	"If Only You Were Here with Me" b/w "All About the Blues"	—	—	Non-album tracks
1958	"You're on My Mind" b/w "Baby Baby Count on Me"	—	—	Non-album tracks
1958	"Shooty Booty" b/w "I'm So Glad I Found You"	—	—	Non-album tracks
1958	"Yes I Want You" b/w "You Flip Me Baby"	94	13	Non-album tracks
1959	"City Lights" b/w "Stolen Moments"	92	—	This Is Ivory Joe Hunter
1959	"Old Fashioned Love" b/w "A Cottage for Sale"	—	—	This Is Ivory Joe Hunter
1959	"I Just Want to Love You" b/w "Now I Don't Worry No More"	—	—	Non-album tracks
1959	"Welcome Home Baby" b/w "I Love You So Much"	—	—	This Is Ivory Joe Hunter
1959	"My Search Was Ended" b/w "Did You Mean It"	—	—	This Is Ivory Joe Hunter
1959	"Guess Who" b/w "Don't Fall in Love With Me"	—	—	Sixteen of His Greatest Hits
1960	"Let Them Say" b/w "It Must Be Love"	—	—	Non-album tracks
1960	"It's Love, It's Love, It's Love" b/w "You Satisfy Me Baby"	—	—	Non-album tracks
1961	"Because I Love You" b/w "I'm Hooked"	—	—	Non-album tracks
1961	"You Better Believe It, Baby b/w "May the Best Man Win"	—	—	Non-album tracks
1962	"The Life I Live" b/w "Great Big Heart Full of Love"	—	—	Non-album tracks
1962	"You Only Want Me When You Need Me" b/w "Somebody's Stealing My Love"	—	—	Non-album tracks
1963	"My Arms Are Waiting" b/w "Congratulations"	—	—	Non-album tracks
1963	"There's No Forgetting You" b/w "My Lover's Prayer"	—	—	Non-album tracks
1964	"Can't Explain How It Happened" b/w "This Kind of Woman"	—	—	Non-album tracks
1964	"I Need a Woman" b/w "I've Been Searching"	—	—	Non-album tracks
1966	"Every Little Bit Helped Me" b/w "I Can Make You Happy"	—	—	Non-album tracks
1966	"Heart! Don't Love Her Anymore" b/w "I've Asked You for the Last Time"	—	—	Non-album tracks
1967	"Don't You Believe Him" b/w "What's the Matter Baby"	—	—	Non-album tracks
1967	"Did She Ask About Me" b/w "From the First Time We Met"	—	—	Non-album tracks
1968	"Ivory Tower" b/w "I'll Give You All Night to Stop"	—	—	Non-album tracks
1969	"I Built a Wall Around Me" b/w "Until the Day I Die"	—	—	Non-album tracks
1969	"Baby Me Baby" b/w "Straighten Up Baby"	—	—	Non-album tracks
1971	"Heartbreak and Misery" b/w "We All Like That Groovy Feeling"	—	—	The Return of Ivory Joe Hunter

== Albums ==
- Ivory Joe Hunter, Atlantic (1957)
- Mean Woman Blues, Pickwick (Grand Prix Series)

== Notes ==
- J.C. Marion. JammUpp 23: "Let Me Dream: Ivory Joe Hunter"
- Tom Simon. "Ivory Joe Hunter"
