= Pretty Mama Blues =

Song
- Released: 1948
- Songwriter(s): Ivory Joe Hunter

"Pretty Mama Blues" is a 1948 song written and performed by Ivory Joe Hunter. Hunter's second release was his first number one on the US Billboard R&B chart. "Pretty Mama Blues' spent three weeks at the number one spot.
