= Pee Wee Crayton =

American guitarist and singer (1914–1985)

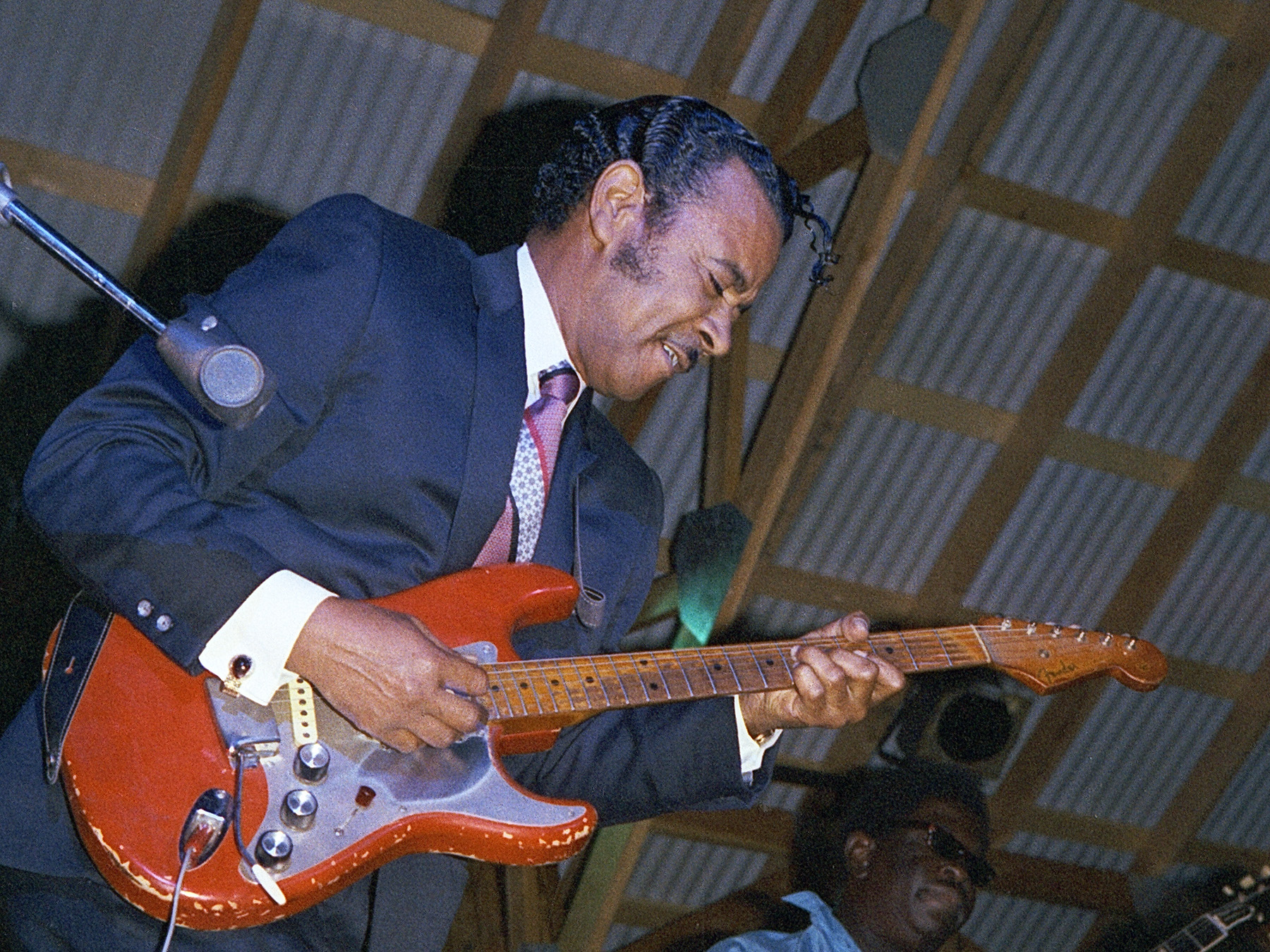
- Crayton at the 1970 Ann Arbor Blues Festival

Background information
- Born: Connie Curtis Crayton; December 18, 1914; Rockdale, Texas, U.S.
- Died: June 25, 1985 (aged 70) Los Angeles, California, U.S.
- Genres: Rhythm and blues, blues
- Occupations: Guitarist, singer
- Instrument: Guitar
- Years active: 1940s–1985
- Label: Various

Connie Curtis Crayton (December 18, 1914 – June 25, 1985), known as Pee Wee Crayton, was an American R&B and blues guitarist and singer.

== Career ==
Crayton was born in Rockdale, Texas. He began playing guitar seriously after moving to California in 1935, later settling in Oakland. While there, he absorbed the music of T-Bone Walker, who taught Crayton the basics of electric guitar work. Crayton developed his own unique approach.

In 1948, he signed a recording contract with Modern Records. One of his first recordings was the instrumental "Blues After Hours", which reached number 1 on the Billboard R&B chart late that year. Its B-side, the pop ballad "I'm Still in Love with You", and the quicker "Texas Hop" are good examples of his work.

In 1950, Crayton and his Orchestra performed at the sixth Cavalcade of Jazz concert, held at Wrigley Field in Los Angeles and produced by Leon Hefflin, Sr. on June 25. Featured on the same day were Lionel Hampton, Roy Milton's Orchestra, Dinah Washington, Tiny Davis and Her Hell Divers, and other artists. 16,000 were reported to be in attendance. The concert ended early because of a fracas while Lionel Hampton played "Flying High".

He went on to record for many other record labels in the 1950s, including Imperial in New Orleans, Vee-Jay in Chicago and Jamie in Philadelphia. It is thought he was the first blues guitarist to use a Fender Stratocaster, playing one given to him by Leo Fender.

His opening guitar riff on the 1954 single "Do Unto Others" was "quoted" by John Lennon in the beginning of the B-side single version of "Revolution" released by The Beatles on Apple Records in 1968.

Crayton’s album Things I Used to Do was released by Vanguard Records in 1971. He continued to tour and record in the following years.

A longtime resident of Los Angeles, California, Crayton died there of a heart attack in 1985. He was interred in the Inglewood Park Cemetery.

== Legacy ==
On May 8, 2019, Crayton was posthumously inducted into the Blues Hall of Fame by long-time friend Doug MacLeod in a ceremony held in Memphis, Tennessee by the Blues Foundation.

== Discography ==
=== 10" Shellac (78-rpm) and 7" vinyl (45-rpm) records ===
- "After Hours' Boogie" / "Why Did You Go", 4 Star 1304 (1947, released 1949)
- "Don't Ever Fall in Love" / "Pee Wee Special", Gru-V-Tone 217 (1947, released 1949)
- "Blues After Hours" / "I'm Still in Love with You", Modern 20-624 (1948)
- "Texas Hop" / "Central Avenue Blues", Modern 20-643 (1948)
- "Boogie Woogie Basement" / "Boogie Woogie Upstairs", billed as Al "Cake" Wichard Trio Featuring Pee Wee Crayton on Guitar, Modern 20-657 (1949)
- "When Darkness Falls" / "Rock Island Blues", Modern 20-658 (1949)
- "The Bop Hop" / "I Love You So", Modern 20-675 (1949)
- "Long After Hours" / "Brand New Woman", Modern 20-707 (1949)
- "Old Fashioned Baby" / "Bounce Pee Wee", Modern 20-719 (1949)
- "Please Come Back" / "Rockin' the Blues", Modern 20-732 (1950)
- "Some Rainy Day" / "Huckle Boogie", Modern 20-742 (1950)
- "Answer to Blues After Hours" / "Louella Brown", Modern 20-763 (1950)
- "Good Little Woman" / "Dedicating the Blues", Modern 20-774 (1950)
- "Change Your Way of Lovin'" / "Tired of Travelin'", Modern 20-796 (1951)
- "Poppa Stoppa" / "Thinkin' of You", Modern 20-816 (1951)
- "When It Rains, It Pours" / "Daybreak", Aladdin 3112 (1951)
- "Cool Evening" / "Have You Lost Your Love for Me" Modern 20-892 (1952)
- "Crying and Walking" / "Pappy's Blues", RIH (Recorded in Hollywood) 408 (1953)
- "I'm Your Prisoner" / "Baby, Pat the Floor", RIH (Recorded in Hollywood) 426 (1953)
- "Steppin' Out" / "Hey Little Dreamboat", Hollywood 1055 (1953, released 1956)
- "Do Unto Others" / "Every Dog Has A Day", Imperial 5288 (1954)
- "Wino-O" / "Hurry, Hurry", Imperial 5297 (1954)
- "I Need Your Love" / "You Know, Yeah", Imperial 5321 (1954)
- "My Idea About You" / "I Got News for You", Imperial 5338 (1955)
- "Eyes Full of Tears" / "Runnin' Wild", Imperial 5345 (1954, released 1955)
- "Yours Truly" / "Be Faithful", Imperial 5353 (1955)
- "Don't Go" / "I Must Go On", Post (Imperial subsidiary) 2007 (1955, released 1956)
- "The Telephone Is Ringing" / "A Frosty Night", Vee Jay 214 (1956)
- "I Don't Care" / "I Found My Peace of Mind", with the El Dorados, Vee Jay 252 (1957)
- "Is This the Price I Pay" / "Fiddle De Dee", Vee Jay 266 (1957)
- "Look Up and Live" / "Give Me One More Chance", with the Four Temps, Fox 102 (1959)
- "Tain't Nobody's Biz-Ness If I Do" / "Little Bitty Things", Jamie 1190 (1960, released 1961)
- "I'm Still in Love with You" / "Time on My Hands", Guyden 2048 (1961)
- "Git to Gittin'" / "Hillbilly Blues", Smash 1774 (1962)

=== LP and CD releases and compilations of note ===
- Pee Wee Crayton, Crown LP CLP-5175 (1960), P-Vine LP PLP-6625 (1991)
- Things I Used to Do, Vanguard 6566 (1971)
- Great Rhythm & Blues Oldies, Volume 5: Pee Wee Crayton, Blues Spectrum (Johnny Otis's label) LP BS-105 (1974)
- Everyday I Have the Blues, Big Joe Turner with Crayton and Sonny Stitt, Pablo LP 2310-818 (1978)
- Have No Fear Joe Turner Is Here, Big Joe Turner and Crayton, Pablo LP 2310-863 (1981)
- Peace of Mind, Charly R&B LP CFM-601 (1982), 10" vinyl LP containing all 10 tracks that Crayton recorded for Vee Jay Records in 1956–1957
- Blues Guitar Genius: Pee Wee Crayton, Volume 1, Ace LP CH-23 (1982), 10" vinyl LP containing tracks recorded for Modern Records, 1949–1952
- Rocking Down on Central Avenue: Pee Wee Crayton, Volume Two, Ace LP CHA-61 (1982), tracks recorded for Modern Records.
- Make Room for Pee Wee, Murray Brothers LP MB-1005 (recorded August 1983)
- Early Hour Blues, Murray Brothers LP MB-1007 (recorded December 1984)
- Pee Wee Crayton: Memorial Album, Ace LP CHD-177 (1986), tracks recorded for Modern Records
- After Hours Boogie: Pee Wee Crayton and His Guitar, Blues Boy LP BB-307 (1988), tracks recorded from 1947 to 1962 for numerous labels, with Crayton's first demo recording, "Pee Wee's Hop" (1945), a piano–guitar–bass instrumental
- Pee Wee's Blues: The Complete Aladdin and Imperial Recordings, Capitol-EMI 36292 (1996)
- Blues After Hours: The Essential Pee Wee Crayton, Blues Encore 52045 (1996), recordings made for numerous labels, 1947–1956
- The Modern Legacy, Volume 1, Ace CHD-632 (1996)
- Early Hour Blues, Blind Pig 5052 (1999), CD containing both Murray Brothers albums
- Blues Guitar Magic: The Modern Legacy, Volume 2, Ace CHD-767 (2000)
- Blues After Hours: The Essential Pee Wee Crayton, Indigo 2526 (2002), tracks recorded for Modern Records, 1948–1951
- Texas Blues Jumpin' in Los Angeles: The Modern Music Sessions 1948–1951, Ace CHD-1400 (2014)
- The Pee Wee Crayton Collection 1947–1962, Acrobat ADDCD-3202 (2017) 2CD
- Texas Hop and Selected Singles (A's & B's): His Golden Decade 1947–1957, Jasmine JASMCD-3139 (2020) 2CD

== See also ==
- Chicago Blues Festival
- List of artists who reached number one on the Billboard R&B chart
- List of electric blues musicians
- List of Texas blues musicians
- List of West Coast blues musicians
- Long Beach Blues Festival
- San Francisco Blues Festival
- West Coast blues
