= Sonny Thompson =

American R&B bandleader and pianist (1916–1989)

Sonny Thompson (probably August 23, 1916 – August 11, 1989), born Alfonso Thompson or Hezzie Tompson, was an American R&B bandleader and pianist, popular in the 1940s and 1950s.

== Biography ==
There is some uncertainty over Thompson's origins, as well as his birth name. Researchers Bob Eagle and Eric LeBlanc indicate that he was born in 1916 in Wilkinson County, Mississippi, but other sources state that he was born in 1923, either in Mississippi or in Chicago.

He began recording in 1946, and in 1948 achieved two number-one R&B chart hits on the Miracle label – "Long Gone (Parts I and II)" and "Late Freight", both featuring saxophonist Eddie Chamblee. "Long Gone", sold in excess of one million copies. The follow-ups "Blue Dreams" and "Still Gone" also reached the R&B chart. By 1952 he had moved on to King Records, where he worked in A&R and as a session musician and arranger. At King, he had further R&B Top 10 successes with the singer Lula Reed, the biggest hit being "I'll Drown in My Tears". Thompson married Reed sometime in the early 1950s. He continued to work as a session musician, and to perform with Reed into the early 1960s.

He also had success as a songwriter, often co-writing with blues guitarist, Freddie King. Songs Thompson wrote (or co-wrote) included "I'm Tore Down", "Let Them Talk", "Hide Away", "The Stumble", "Three Hearts in a Tangle", "Late Freight", and "Long Gone".

Thompson died in 1989 in Chicago. In 2024 the Killer Blues Headstone Project placed the headstone for him at Homewood Memorial Cemetery in Homewood, Illinois.

== Discography ==
=== Original 10" shellac (78 rpm) and 7" vinyl (45 rpm) releases ===
MIRACLE releases:

- 108 Sonny's Blues* // Screamin' Boogie ---by Dick Davis and Orchestra featuring Sonny Thompson (*vocal by Sonny)
- 109 Memphis Train // Benson Jump ---by Dick Davis and Orchestra featuring Sonny Thompson
- 123 If I Didn't Have You** // Palmer's Boogie ---by Sonny Thompson Orchestra (**vocal by Gladys Palmer; "Palmer's Boogie" is a piano duet between Sonny and Gladys)
- 124 Tears Follow My Dreams*** // Moon Is On My Side ---by Sonny Thompson with the Sharps and Flats [Arvin Garrett-guitar/Leroy Morrison-bass/Thurman "Red" Cooper-drums] (***vocal by Browley Guy)
- 126 Long Gone (Pt. 1) // Long Gone (Pt. 2)+ ---by Sonny Thompson with the Sharps and Flats (+featuring Eddie Chamblee-tenor sax)
- 127 In The Rain** // Just Boogie (AKA "Deadline Boogie") ---by Sonny Thompson with the Sharps and Flats (**vocal by Gladys Palmer)
- 128 Late Freight (AKA "Creepin'")+ // Sonny's Return (AKA "House Full Of Blues" or simply "Blues") ---by Sonny Thompson Quintet (+featuring Eddie Chamblee-tenor sax)
- 131 Blue Dreams+ // Blues On Rhumba ---by Sonny Thompson and Orchestra (+featuring Eddie Chamblee-tenor sax)
- 139 Still Gone (Pt. 3) // Still Gone (Pt. 4) ---by Sonny "Long Gone" Thompson and Orchestra
- 146 Dreaming Again // Backyard Affair ---by Sonny Thompson and Orchestra
- 148 Sonny Claus Blues* // Not On A Xmas Tree ---by Sonny Thompson and Orchestra (*vocal by Sonny)

OLD SWING MASTER (or simply 'MASTER') release:

- 1011 The Fish (Pt. 1) // The Fish (Pt. 2) ---by Sonny Thompson and His Orchestra

KING releases:

- 4345 Sugar Cane // I'm Coming Back Home To Stay^ (^vocal by band ensemble)
- 4364 After Sundown // Frog Legs
- 4384 Nightfall // Palmetto
- 4399 Blues For The Night Owls // Harlem Rug Cutter
- 4431 Smoke Stack Blues // Uncle Sam Blues* (*vocal by Jesse Edwards)
- 4438 Long Gone (Pt. 1) // Long Gone (Pt. 2) ---reissue of Miracle 126
- 4446 Gone Again Blues // Jumping With The Rhumba* (*vocal by Jesse Edwards)
- 4470 Blue Piano** // Sunshine Blues (**vocal by Royal Trent)
- 4488 Mellow Blues (Pt. 1) // Mellow Blues (Pt. 2) (featuring Robert Hadley-tenor sax on both sides)
- 4527 I'll Drown In My Tears*** // Clang, Clang, Clang (***vocal by Lula Reed)
- 4541 Let's Call It A Day*** // Blues Mambo (***vocal by Lula Reed)
- 4554 Real, Real Fine (Pt. 1) // Real, Real Fine (Pt. 2)
- 4595 Chloe // Last Night*** (***vocal by Lula Reed)
- 4613 Clean Sweep // Insulated Sugar+ (+vocal by Rufus Junior)
- 4639 Low Flame // Waiting To Be Loved By You*** (***vocal by Lula Reed)
- 4657 Let's Move // My Heart Needs Someone+ (+vocal by Rufus Junior)
- 4678 Pastry // I Hope You Love Me Too+ (+vocal by Rufus Junior)
- 4698 Things Ain't What They Used To Be // So-o-o Good
- 4712 Down In The Dumps // I Ain't No Watch Dog++ (++vocal by Paul Tate)
- 4718 Single Shot // I'm Beggin' And Pleadin'++ (++vocal by Paul Tate)
- 4729 Cotton Ball (Pt. 1) // Cotton Ball (Pt. 2) (featuring David Bubba Brooks-tenor sax on both sides)
- 4746 Cat On The Keys (Pt. 1) // Cat On The Keys (Pt. 2)
- 4791 Behind The Sun (Pt. 1) // Behind The Sun (Pt. 2)
- 4809 First Base // Lonely Moon
- 4899 I'll Drown In My Tears // Let's Call It A Day ---reissues of King 4527A and 4541A
- 4992 Low Down // Lost In This Great Big City++ (++vocal by Paul Tate)
- 5055 Gum Shoe+++ // Stop, Come See Me++ (++vocal by Paul Tate; +++featuring King Curtis-tenor sax)
- 5396 The Duck Walk // Swinging Shepherd Blues

CHART releases:

- 611 It's Love, It's Love // Mexico Bound (vocal by The Champions "vocal group" on both sides)
- 612 Slow Rock (Pt. 1) // Slow Rock (Pt. 2) (featuring David Bubba Brooks-tenor sax on both sides)
- 618 Bus Ride // Foot Stompin' (featuring David Bubba Brooks-tenor sax on both sides)
- 620 The Same Old Story // Pay Me Some Attention (vocal by The Champions "vocal group" on both sides)
- 630 Bus Ride // Foot Stompin' (featuring David Bubba Brooks-tenor sax on both sides) ---reissue of Chart 618
- 631 Come On // Big Bad Beulah (vocal by The Champions "vocal group" on both sides)
- 633 Juke Joint (Pt. 1) // Juke Joint (Pt. 2)
- 637 Drive In // Drive Out
- 642 Candy (Pt. 1) // Candy (Pt. 2)
- 645 Hi-Ho // Day Break Blues
- 648 Caribbean Cruise // Night Watch

=== Original 7" vinyl EP releases ===
- Sonny Thompson, Vol. 1 (King KEP-209, 1952) -song titles: Mellow Blues (Pt. 2); Sugar Cane // Long Gone (Pt. 2); Real, Real Fine (Pt. 2)
- Sonny Thompson, Vol. 2 (King KEP-264, 1953) -song titles: I'll Drown In My Tears (vocal by Lula Reed); Let's Call It A Day (vocal by Lula Reed) // Low Flame; Chloe
- Sonny Thompson, Vol. 3 (King KEP-273, 1954) -song titles: Blues For The Night Owls; Blues Mambo // Clean Sweep; Down In The Dumps
- Sonny Thompson, Vol. 4 (King KEP-274, 1954) -song titles: Let's Move; Single Shot // Sunshine Blues; Frog Legs
- Sonny Thompson, Vol. 5 (King KEP-275, 1954) -song titles: Things Ain't What They Used To Be; So-o-o Good // Clang, Clang, Clang; Pastry

=== Original 12" vinyl LP releases ===
- Moody Blues (Play Only After Midnight) (King LP-568, 1958) -song titles: Long Gone (Pt. 1); Long Gone (Pt. 2); After Sundown; Low Down; Blues For The Night Owls; Cotton Ball (Pt. ?); Sunshine Blues; Behind The Sun (Pt. ?) // Mellow Blues (Pt. ?); So-o-o Good; Pastry; Low Flame; Nightfall; Lonely Moon; Gone Again Blues; Down In The Dumps
- Mellow Blues For The Late Hours (16 Instrumentals) (King LP-655, 1959) -song titles: Mellow Blues (Pt. 1); Palmetto; Clang, Clang, Clang; Sugar Cane; Cat On The Keys (Pt. 1); Cat On The Keys (Pt. 2); Cotton Ball (Pt. 1); Single Shot // Smoke Stack Blues; Real, Real Fine (Pt. ?); Let's Move; Behind The Sun (Pt. ?); Blues Mambo; First Base; Gum Shoe; Frog Legs

=== As sideman ===
With Howlin' Wolf

- Message to the Young (Chess, 1971)
