= Long Gone (instrumental) =

1948 instrumental by Sonny Thompson

"Long Gone" is a 1948 instrumental by Sonny Thompson with the Sharps and Flats. The single, which features Thompson on piano, Arvid Garrett on guitar and Eddie Chamblee on tenor sax, spent three weeks at number one on the R&B chart and became his most successful song on the charts.

== See also ==
- List of Billboard number-one R&B singles of the 1940s
