= Arbee Stidham =

American blues musician (1917–1988)

- Born: Arbee William Stidham; February 9, 1917; De Valls Bluff, Arkansas, United States
- Died: April 26, 1988 (aged 71) Chicago, Illinois, United States
- Genres: Jump jazz; Blues; Jazz blues; Kansas City shouters
- Occupations: Musician, composer
- Instruments: Saxophone, Guitar, Clarinet, Piano
- Years active: 1920–1982
- Labels: Charly, Folkways, Mainstream, Pearl, Prestige, RCA Victor, Sun

Arbee William Stidham (February 9, 1917 – April 26, 1988) was an American blues singer and multi-instrumentalist.

According to the authors of the book All Music Guide to the Blues: The Definitive Guide to the Blues, Stidham was "exactly the sort of singer that thrived in the R&B or 'race' market after World War II; although essentially a bluesman, he wasn't a blues purist... his mixture of blues, jazz and gospel made him quite popular... in the '40s and '50s".

== Early life ==
Arbee Stidham was born at De Valls Bluff, Arkansas, United States, in 1917 to Luttie Abraham and Mable (née Perkins) Stidham and into a family steeped in music. Stidham's father was a musician in the Jimmie Lunceford Band, his uncle Ernest Stidham was the leader of the Memphis Jug Band and his uncle Isaiah was a violinist. Stidham attended the Prairie Valley Training (elementary) School as a child and Paul Laurence Dunbar High School in Little Rock, Arkansas.

== Early music career ==
Stidham first learned to play a clarinet given to him by a local merchant in De Valls Bluff. Stidham said: "That's what I learned to play, and after I learned to play the clarinet, I went to the saxophone".

=== Maternal disapproval of "the blues" ===
"I always loved (the) blues", Stidham said. "They didn't call the blues "blues" when I was a boy, they called them "reels". My mother used to tell me '...You don't do nothing but sing those reels - and you're going to hell'". Stidham used to order records, "Louis Armstrong and things on that kick" and listen to them late at night at low volume. His mother would hear the music, get up and confiscate his records. "My grandfather would steal them back and give them right back to me". At the age of twelve, Stidham made his first appearance at the Ninth Street Theatre in Little Rock, Arkansas. His mother watched the performance, never sitting down. When the show was over, Stidham said "she grabbed me and hugged me and kissed me. She said 'I'm proud of you in a way, but you're still going to hell, singing those reels'".

A tenor saxophone player, Stidham formed a seven-piece band named "Arbee Stidham and His Southern Syncopators" at the age of thirteen. Stidham's band backed Bessie Smith during tour stops in 1930 and 1931, appeared frequently on KARK-AM radio in Little Rock and continued to work clubs in Little Rock and Memphis, Tennessee. After playing venues throughout the south, Stidham toured with his band in Chicago, playing with Lucky Millinder during the 1930s.

== Chicago recording sessions ==
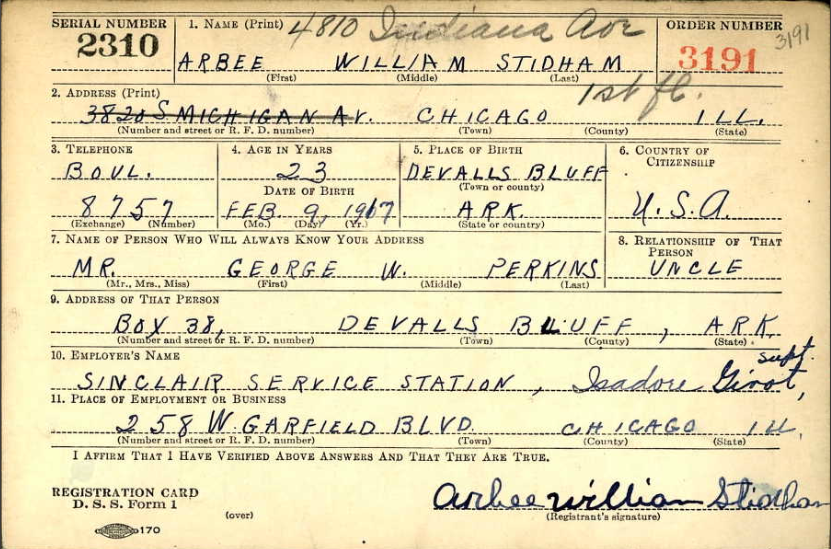
Arbee William Stidham WWII Draft Card

In the mid-1940s, Stidham moved to Chicago, where he met Lester Melrose, who signed him to a recording contract with RCA Victor in 1947. His biggest hit, "My Heart Belongs to You", was recorded at his first session.

=== Number one hit ===
When "My Heart Belongs to You" was released, a copy was sent to Zenas Sears, an Atlanta disk jockey and music producer at WGST AM radio. Sears tried the song and his audience flooded the station with calls, asking to hear the record again and again. Sears recommended the record to Gene Nobles, the R&B disc jockey at Nashville's WLAC AM. The first night Noble played the song, he received 181 calls to play it again. The record reached number one on the Billboard "Race Records" chart in June 1948. At the same time, the record was also listed on Billboard's "ten most-played juke box records" for several weeks.

Stidham spent the rest of his career trying to achieve the same success, recording for Checker, States, and other independent record labels as a jazz-influenced blues vocalist.

=== Misidentification ===
On some recordings, Stidham's name is mistakenly listed as "R. B. Stidham". For instance, the 1985 Ace Records (UK) album, Ike Turner And His Kings Of Rhythm Vol. 2, lists Stidham's composition "My Heart Belongs To You" using the incorrect spelling of Stidham's name.

== Later music career ==
Stidham was in a car crash in the 1950s. When he found his injuries made it impossible for him to play the saxophone without suffering nose bleeds, he became heavily depressed. Stidham's wife urged him to learn to play the guitar. "So I bought one", Stidham said. Fellow musician Big Maceo Merriweather told him "You're always running around with (Earl) Hooker, that's somebody who could tell you something". Stidham said "so between Big Bill Broonzy, and Hooker, I started to learn. Hooker would teach me the single string thing, 'cause he was a wizard at that. He would stop by every once in a while and give me pointers".

=== 1960s recordings ===
Stidham played the guitar and sang on recordings for Folkways Records in the early 1960s. Stidham recorded five songs on May 25, 1965 at the Sun Records studio in Memphis, Tennessee. The songs were not immediately released, appearing on a Sun album eleven years later.

=== Cleveland era ===
Stidham moved to Cleveland, Ohio, in the 1970s. He appeared regularly at the Pirates Cove nightclub, often accompanying Robert Lockwood Jr. & The All Stars. Stidham was a lecturer on the Blues music genre at Cleveland State University in the 1970s. He also recorded occasionally during the early 1970s and performed at music festivals and clubs in the United States and abroad.

=== Documentary film subject ===
While living in Cleveland in 1973, Stidham was the subject of The Bluesman, a short documentary film directed by Kent State University professor Robert West. The film was described as "a portrait of the underground legend, American blues singer Arbee Stidham, a Depression era musician in a film of melancholy reality".

=== Later live performances ===
In January, 1982, Stidham performed with Willie Dixon's "Blues Rent Party" band during the Chicago Winter Jazz Fair held at the Blackstone Hotel. Dixon's band also included Sunnyland Slim, Homesick James, Odie Payne, and others.

In August, 1982, Stidham performed with the Arbee Stidham Blues Band at the Petrillo Band Shell during the 4th Annual Kool Jazz Festival held in Grant Park, Chicago, Illinois. The band members included Henderson Smith, trumpet; Ahmad Salaheldeen, Tommy "Madman" Jones, Nat Reed, saxophones; Lacey Gibson, guitar; Lafayette Leake, piano; Camille, bass; Odie Payne, drums, many of whom were well-known Chicago musicians. A review of the performance said "blues shouter Arbee Stidham gave the crowd of 8,000 fans a rough, cheerfully energetic set. Stalking the stage with the sly, bent-kneed zeal of a Groucho Marx, Stidham sang with a similarly sly sense of humor".

== Death and burial ==
Stidham died on April 26, 1988, at the University of Chicago Medical Center in Cook County, Illinois, aged 71. Stidham is buried at Oakridge Cemetery in Hillside, Illinois. In 2020 the Killer Blues Headstone Project placed a headstone for him there.

== Discography ==
=== LPs ===
- Arbee's Blues (Folkways, 1961)
- Tired of Wandering - The Blues Of Arbee Stidham (Bluesville, 1961)
- A Time for Blues (Mainstream, 1972)
- There's Always Tomorrow (Folkways, 1973)
- Sun - The Roots of Rock Volume 6: Sunset Soul (Charly, 1976)
- My Heart Belongs To You (Crown Prince, 1981)
- Long Man Blues (Pearl, 1990)
