= Messin' Around (Memphis Slim song) =

1948 blues song

"Messin' Around" is a 1948 song written by Floyd Hunt and recorded by Memphis Slim and His House Rockers, released as Miracle Records 125. It was Slim's first and only R&B chart No.1, spending two weeks at the top of the chart from September 4, 1948.
