= Late Freight =

1948 song by the Sonny Thompson Quintet

"Late Freight" is a 1948 instrumental by the Sonny Thompson Quintet featuring Eddie Chamblee. The single was Sonny Thompson's second release to reach the charts and became his second and final number-one hit on the R&B chart.
