= American Pie (song) =

1971 single by Don McLean

- US vinyl single. The artwork was also used as the front cover for the album of the same name and many other international single releases.

Single by Don McLean

from the album American Pie
- B-side: "Empty Chairs" (promo); "American Pie part 2" (first release)
- Released: October 1971
- Recorded: May 26, 1971
- Studio: Record Plant (New York, NY)
- Genre: Folk rock
- Length: 8:42 (LP); 4:11 (single part 1); 4:31 (single part 2)
- Label: United Artists
- Songwriter: Don McLean
- Producer: Ed Freeman

Don McLean singles chronology
"Castles in the Air" (1971)	"American Pie" (1971)	"Vincent" (1972)

Lyric video
- "American Pie" on YouTube

Audio
- "American Pie" on YouTube

Live video
- "American Pie live performance on BBC, July 29, 1972" on YouTube

Audio sample
- file; help

"American Pie" is a song by the American singer and songwriter Don McLean. It was a commercial success and cultural touchstone, notable for its extensive and ambiguous lyrics about America's changing society in the 1950s and 1960s.

Recorded and released in 1971 on the album of the same name, the single was the number-one US hit for four weeks in 1972 starting January 15 after just eight weeks on the US Billboard charts (where it entered at number 69).

The song also topped the charts in Australia, Canada (5 weeks at #1), and New Zealand. In the United Kingdom, the single reached number 2, where it stayed for three weeks on its original 1971 release, and a reissue in 1991 reached No. 12. The song was listed as the No. 5 song on the RIAA project Songs of the Century. A truncated version of the song was covered by Madonna in 2000 and reached No. 1 in at least 15 countries, including the UK, Canada, and Australia. At 8 minutes and 42 seconds, McLean's combined version is the sixth longest song to enter the Billboard Hot 100 (at the time of release it was the longest). The song also held the record for almost 50 years for being the longest song to reach number one before Taylor Swift's "All Too Well (10 Minute Version)" broke the record in 2021. Due to its exceptional length, it was initially released as a two-sided 7-inch single. "American Pie" has been described as "one of the most successful and debated songs of the 20th century".

The repeated phrase "the day the music died" refers to a plane crash in 1959 that killed early rock and roll stars Buddy Holly, The Big Bopper, and Ritchie Valens, ending the era of early rock and roll; this became the popular nickname for that crash. The theme of the song goes beyond mourning McLean's childhood music heroes, reflecting the deep cultural changes and profound disillusion and loss of innocence of his generation – the early rock and roll generation – that took place between the 1959 plane crash and either late 1969 or late 1970. The meaning of the other lyrics, which cryptically allude to many of the jarring events and social changes experienced during that period, has been debated for decades. McLean repeatedly declined to explain the symbolism behind the many characters and events mentioned; he eventually released his songwriting notes to accompany the original manuscript when it was sold in 2015, explaining many of these. McLean further elaborated on the lyrical meaning in a 2022 documentary celebrating the song's 50th anniversary, in which he stated the song was driven by impressionism, and debunked some of the more widely speculated symbols.

In 2017, McLean's original recording was selected for preservation in the United States National Recording Registry by the Library of Congress as being "culturally, historically, or aesthetically significant". To mark the 50th anniversary of the song, McLean performed a 35-date tour through Europe, starting in Wales and ending in Austria, in 2022. In June 2026, CBS News included the song in its list of the 250 essential American songs of the past 250 years.

== Background ==
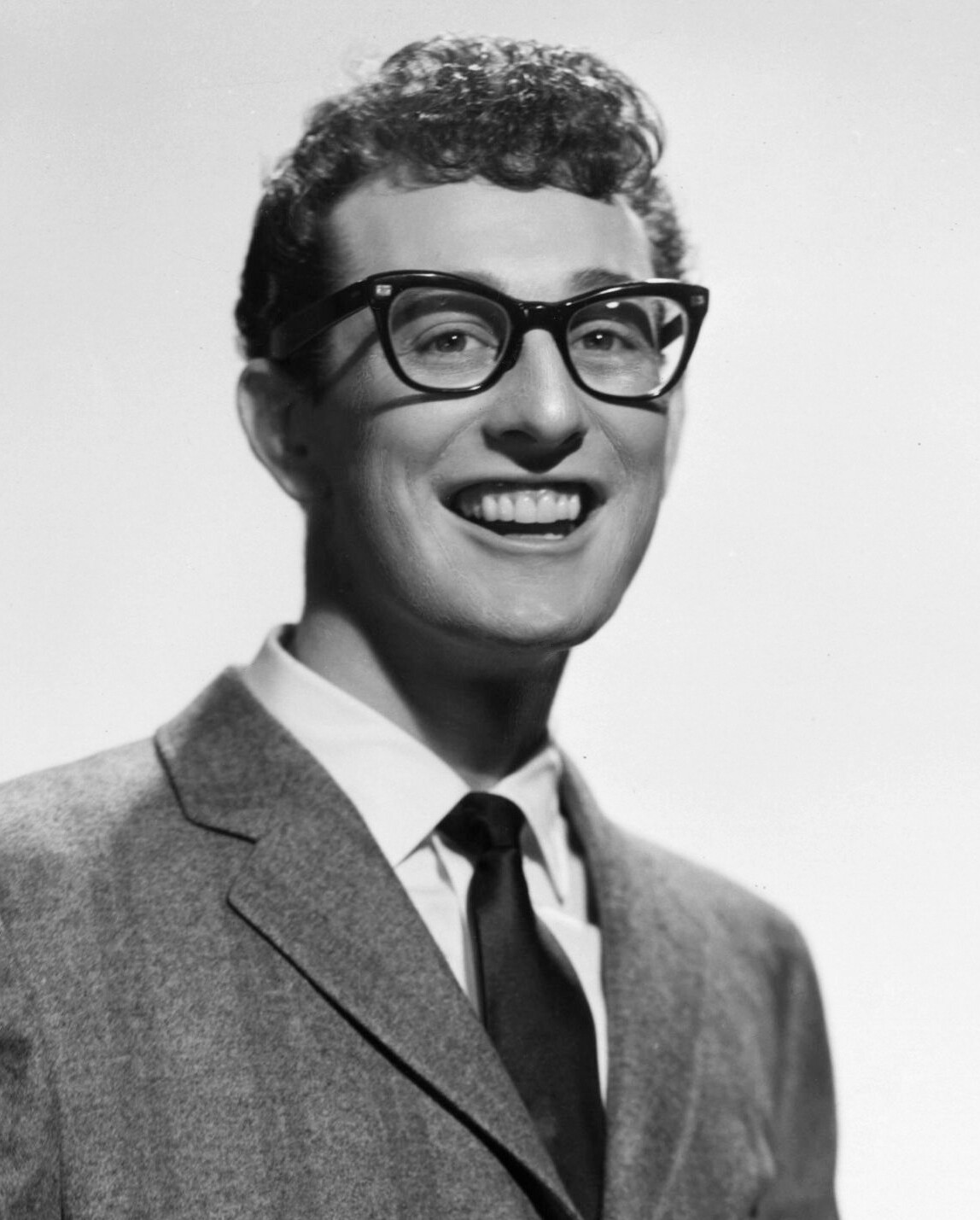
Buddy Holly

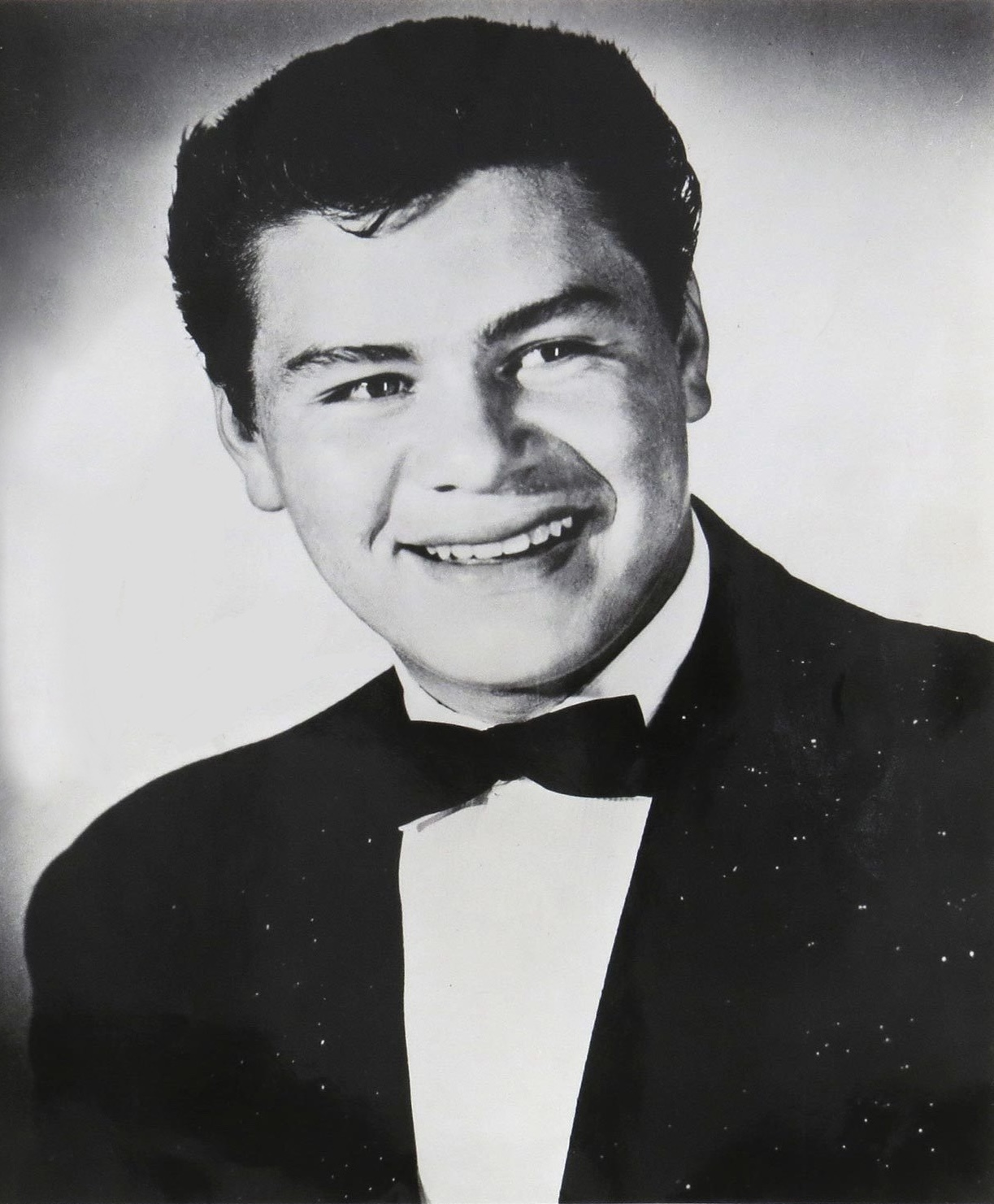
Ritchie Valens

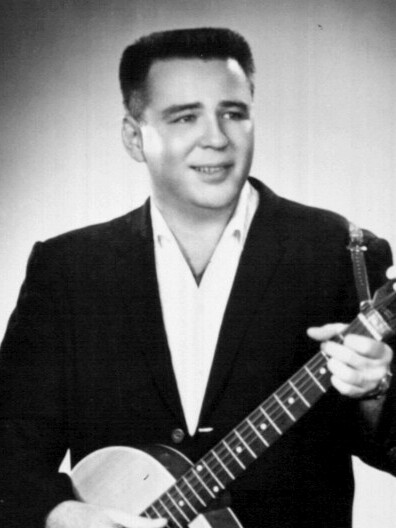
The Big Bopper

Early rock and roll musicians killed in the February 3, 1959, plane crash alluded to in the song

Don McLean drew inspiration for the song from his childhood experience delivering newspapers during the time of the plane crash that killed early rock and roll musicians Buddy Holly, Ritchie Valens, and The Big Bopper:

I first found out about the plane crash because I was a 13-year-old newspaper delivery boy in New Rochelle, New York, and I was carrying the bundle of the local Standard-Star papers that were bound in twine, and when I cut it open with a knife, there it was on the front page.

— Don McLean

McLean reportedly wrote "American Pie" in Saratoga Springs, New York, at Caffè Lena, but a 2011 New York Times article quotes McLean as disputing this claim. Some employees at Caffè Lena claim that he started writing the song there, and then continued to write the song in both Cold Spring, New York, and Philadelphia, Pennsylvania. McLean claims that the song was only written in Cold Spring and Philadelphia. Tin & Lint, a bar on Caroline Street in Saratoga Springs, claims the song was written there, and a plaque marks the table. While a 2022 documentary on the history of the song claims Saint Joseph's University as where the song was first performed, McLean insists that the song made its debut in Philadelphia at Temple University when he opened for Laura Nyro on March 14, 1971.

The song was produced by Ed Freeman and recorded with a few session musicians. Freeman did not want McLean to play rhythm guitar on the song but eventually relented. McLean and the session musicians rehearsed for two weeks but failed to get the song right. At the last minute, the pianist Paul Griffin was added, which is when the tune came together. McLean used a 1969 or 1970 Martin D-28 guitar to provide the basic chords throughout "American Pie".

The song debuted on the album American Pie in October 1971 and was released as a single in November. The song's eight-and-a-half-minute length meant that it could not fit entirely on one side of the 45 RPM record, so United Artists had the first 4:11 taking up the A-side of the record and the final 4:31 the B-side. Radio stations initially played the A-side of the song only, but soon switched to the full album version to satisfy their audiences.

Upon the single release, Cash Box called it "folk-rock's most ambitious and successful epic endeavor since 'Alice's Restaurant'". Record World called it a "monumental accomplishment of lyric writing".

=== Interpretations ===
The sense of disillusion and loss that the song transmits isn't just about deaths in the world of music, but also about a generation that could no longer believe in the utopian dreams of the 1950s... According to McLean, the song represents a shift from the naïve and innocent '50s to the darker decade of the '60s

— Alva Yaffe, Musicholics,

Don called his song a complicated parable, open to different interpretations. "People ask me if I left the lyrics open to ambiguity. Of course I did. I wanted to make a whole series of complex statements. The lyrics had to do with the state of society at the time."

— Super seventies,

The song has nostalgic themes, stretching from the late 1950s until late 1969 or 1970. Except to acknowledge that he first learned about Buddy Holly's death on February 3, 1959 – McLean was age 13 – when he was folding newspapers for his paper route on the morning of February 4, 1959 (hence the line "February made me shiver/with every paper I'd deliver"), McLean has generally avoided responding to direct questions about the song's lyrics; he has said: "They're beyond analysis. They're poetry." He also stated in an editorial published in 2009, on the 50th anniversary of the crash that killed Buddy Holly, Ritchie Valens and The Big Bopper (all of whom are alluded to in the final verse in a comparison with the Holy Trinity), that writing the first verse of the song exorcised his long-running grief over Holly's death and that he considers the song to be "a big song... that summed up the world known as America". McLean dedicated the American Pie album to Holly.

Some commentators have identified the song as outlining the darkening of cultural mood, as over time the cultural vanguard passed from Pete Seeger and Joan Baez (the "King and Queen" of folk music), then from Elvis Presley (known as "the King" of Rock and Roll), to Bob Dylan ("the Jester" – who wore a jacket similar to that worn by cultural icon James Dean (“in a coat he borrowed from James Dean”), was known as "the voice of his generation" ("a voice that came from you and me"), and whose motorcycle accident ("in a cast") left him in reclusion for many years, recording in studios rather than touring ("on the sidelines")), to the Beatles (John Lennon, punned with Vladimir Lenin; though it is to be noted that McLean has stated "the Quartet" is not a reference to the Beatles), to the Byrds (who wrote one of the first psychedelic rock songs, "Eight Miles High", and then "fell fast" – the song was banned, and shortly after, the group declined as it lost members, changed genres, and alienated fans), to the Rolling Stones (who released Their Satanic Majesties Request and the singles "Jumpin' Jack Flash" and "Sympathy for the Devil" ("Jack Flash", "Satan", "The Devil"), and used the Hells Angels – "Angels born in Hell" – as Altamont event security, with fatal consequences), and to Janis Joplin (the "girl who sang the blues" but just "turned away" – she died of a heroin overdose the following year).

It has also been speculated that the song contains numerous references to post-World War II American political events, such as the assassination of John F. Kennedy (known casually as "Jack"), First Lady Jacqueline Kennedy ("his widowed bride"), and subsequent killing of his assassin (whose courtroom trial obviously ended as a result ["adjourned"]), the Cuban Missile Crisis ("Jack be nimble, Jack be quick"), the murders of civil rights workers James Chaney, Andrew Goodman, and Michael Schwerner, and elements of culture such as sock hops ("kicking off shoes" to dance, preventing damage to the varnished floor), cruising with a pickup truck, the rise of the political protest song ("a voice that came from you and me"), drugs and the counterculture, the Manson Family and the Tate–LaBianca murders in the "summer swelter" of August 1969 (the Beatles' song "Helter Skelter") and much more.

Apparent allusions to notable 1950s songs include Don Cornell's The Bible Tells Me So ("If the Bible tells you so?"), Marty Robbins's A White Sport Coat, the lonely teenager ("With a pink carnation") mirroring Robbins's narrator who is rejected in favor of another man for the prom, and The Monotones' "The Book of Love" ("Did you write the book of love").

Many additional and alternative interpretations have also been proposed.

For example, Bob Dylan's first performance in Great Britain was also at a pub called "The King and Queen", and he also appeared more literally "on the sidelines in a (the) cast" – as one of many stars at the back far right of the cover art of the Beatles' album Sgt. Pepper's Lonely Hearts Club Band ("the Sergeants played a marching tune").

The song title itself is a reference to apple pie, an unofficial symbol of the United States and one of its signature comfort foods, as seen in the popular expression "As American as apple pie".

The original United Artists Records inner sleeve featured a free verse poem written by McLean about William Boyd, also known as Hopalong Cassidy, along with a picture of Boyd in full Hopalong regalia. Its inclusion in the album was interpreted to represent a sense of loss of a simplistic type of American culture as symbolized by Hopalong Cassidy and by extension black and white television as a whole.

Mike Mills of R.E.M. reflected: "'American Pie' just made perfect sense to me as a song and that's what impressed me the most. I could say to people this is how to write songs. When you've written at least three songs that can be considered classic that is a very high batting average and if one of those songs happens to be something that a great many people think is one of the greatest songs ever written you've not only hit the top of the mountain but you've stayed high on the mountain for a long time."

=== McLean's responses ===
For McLean, the song is a blueprint of his mind at the time and a homage to his musical influences, but also a roadmap for future students of history:

"If it starts young people thinking about Buddy Holly, about rock 'n' roll and that music, and then it teaches them maybe about what else happened in the country, maybe look at a little history, maybe ask why John Kennedy was shot and who did it, maybe ask why all our leaders were shot in the 1960s and who did it, maybe start to look at war and the stupidity of it — if that can happen, then the song really is serving a wonderful purpose and a positive purpose."

— Mark Kennedy, "Don McLean looks back at his masterpiece, 'American Pie'" (2022)

When asked what "American Pie" meant, McLean jokingly replied, "It means I don't ever have to work again if I don't want to." Later, he stated, "You will find many interpretations of my lyrics but none of them by me... Sorry to leave you all on your own like this but long ago I realized that songwriters should make their statements and move on, maintaining a dignified silence." He also commented on the popularity of his music, "I didn't write songs that were just catchy, but with a point of view, or songs about the environment."

In February 2015, however, McLean announced he would reveal the meaning of the lyrics to the song when the original manuscript went for auction in New York City, in April 2015. The lyrics and notes were auctioned on April 7, 2015, and sold for $1.2 million. In the sale catalogue notes, McLean revealed the meaning in the song's lyrics: "Basically in 'American Pie' things are heading in the wrong direction. It [life] is becoming less idyllic. I don't know whether you consider that wrong or right but it is a morality song in a sense." The catalogue confirmed that the song climaxes with a description of the killing of Meredith Hunter at the Altamont Free Concert, ten years after the plane crash that killed Holly, Valens, and Richardson, and did acknowledge that some of the more well-known symbols in the song were inspired by figures such as Elvis Presley ("the king") and Bob Dylan ("the jester").

In 2017, Bob Dylan was asked about how he was referenced in the song. "A jester? Sure, the jester writes songs like 'Masters of War', 'A Hard Rain's a-Gonna Fall', 'It's Alright, Ma' – some jester. I have to think he's talking about somebody else. Ask him."

In 2022, the documentary The Day the Music Died: The Story of Don McLean's American Pie, produced by Spencer Proffer, was released on the Paramount+ video on-demand service. Proffer said that he told McLean: "It's time for you to reveal what 50 years of journalists have wanted to know." McLean stated that he "needed a big song about America", and the first verse and melody ("A long, long time ago...") seemed to just come to mind.

McLean also answered some of the long-standing questions on the song's lyrics, although not all. He revealed that Presley was not the king referenced in the song, Joplin was not the "girl who sang the blues", and Dylan was not the jester, although he is open to other interpretations. He explained that the "marching band" refers to the military–industrial complex, "sweet perfume" refers to tear gas, and Los Angeles is the "coast" that the Trinity head to ("caught the last train for the coast"), commenting "even God has been corrupted". He also said that the line "This'll be the day that I die" originated from the John Wayne film The Searchers (which inspired Buddy Holly's song "That'll Be the Day"), and the chorus's line "Bye-bye, Miss American Pie" was inspired by a song by Pete Seeger, "Bye Bye, My Roseanna". McLean had originally intended to use "Miss American apple pie", but "apple" was dropped.

On the whole, McLean stated that the lyrics were meant to be impressionist, and that many of the lyrics, only a portion of which were included in the finished recording, were completely fictional with no basis in real-life events.

== Personnel ==
Credits from Richard Buskin, except where noted.

=== Musicians ===
- Don McLean – acoustic guitar, vocals
- David Spinozza – electric guitar
- Paul Griffin – piano
- Bob Rothstein – bass
- Roy Markowitz – drums, tambourine

The final chorus features multi-tracked backing vocals, credited in the album's sleeve notes to the "West Forty Fourth Street Rhythm and Noise Choir". Although the individual choristers have never been publicly named, producer Ed Freeman has claimed that the choir included Pete Seeger, James Taylor, Livingston Taylor and Carly Simon.

=== Technical ===
- Ed Freeman – producer
- Tom Flye – engineer
- Photography/artwork – George Whiteman

== Charts ==
=== Weekly charts ===
Chart (1971–1972)	Peak position
Australia (Kent Music Report)	1
Belgium (Ultratop 50 Flanders)	26
Canada Top Singles (RPM)	1
Canada Adult Contemporary (RPM)	1
Ireland (IRMA)	7
New Zealand (Listener)	1
Norway (VG-lista)	9
Spain (IFPI)	9
UK Singles (Official Charts)	2
US Billboard Hot 100	1
US Adult Contemporary (Billboard)	1
West Germany (GfK)	9

=== Year-end charts ===
Chart (1972)	Position
Australia (Kent Music Report)	4
Canada Top Singles (RPM)	1
UK Singles (OCC)	11
US Billboard Hot 100	3

== Certifications ==
Region	Certification	Certified units/sales
Canada (Music Canada)	5× Platinum	400,000^{‡}
Denmark (IFPI Danmark)	Gold	45,000^{‡}
Germany (BVMI)	Gold	300,000^{‡}
Italy (FIMI)	Gold	50,000^{‡}
New Zealand (RMNZ)	5× Platinum	150,000^{‡}
Spain (Promusicae)	Gold	30,000^{‡}
United Kingdom (BPI)	3× Platinum	1,800,000^{‡}
United States (RIAA)	6× Platinum	6,000,000^{‡}
^{‡} Sales+streaming figures based on certification alone.

== Parodies, revisions, and uses ==
In 1999, "Weird Al" Yankovic wrote and recorded a parody of "American Pie". Titled "The Saga Begins", the song recounts the plot of Star Wars: Episode I – The Phantom Menace from Obi-Wan Kenobi's point of view. While McLean gave permission for the parody, he did not make a cameo appearance in its video, despite popular rumor. McLean himself praised the parody, even admitting to almost singing Yankovic's lyrics during his own live performances because his children played the song so often. An unrelated comedy film franchise by Universal Pictures, who secured the rights to McLean's title, also debuted in 1999.

"American Pie" was the last song to be played on Virgin Radio before it was rebranded as Absolute Radio in 2008. It was also the last song played on BFBS Malta in 1979.

In 2012, the City of Grand Rapids, Michigan, created a lip dub video to "American Pie" in response to a Newsweek article that stated the city was "dying". (Due to licensing issues, the version used in the video was not the original, but rather a later-recorded live version.) The video was hailed as a fantastic performance by many, including film critic Roger Ebert, who said it was "the greatest music video ever made".

In 2013, Harmonix announced that "American Pie" would be the final downloadable track made available for the Rock Band series of music video games. This was the case until Rock Band 4 was released in 2015, reviving the series' downloadable content.

On March 14, 2015, the National Museum of Mathematics announced that one of two winners of its songwriting contest was "American Pi" by mathematics education professor Dr. Lawrence M. Lesser. The contest was in honor of "Pi Day of the Century" because "3/14/15" would be the only day in the 21st-century showing the first five digits of π (pi).

In 2015, John Mayer covered "American Pie" live on the Late Show with David Letterman, at the request of the show's eponymous host.

In 2021, McLean released a re-recording of "American Pie" featuring lead vocals by country a cappella group Home Free.

In 2023, during his visit to the United States, South Korean President Yoon Suk-yeol sang the song at a state dinner. Afterwards Don McLean humorously offered to perform a duet version with Yoon.

In the 2006 film Love Comes to the Executioner, Jeremy Renner sings an a cappella version as his character walks to the execution chamber. The song was featured in the 2021 film Black Widow. It is the favorite song of the character Yelena Belova, and is sung by Red Guardian later in the film to comfort her. That same year it was featured in the film Finch.

== Madonna version ==
"American Pie"

Single by Madonna

from the album The Next Best Thing
- Released: February 8, 2000
- Recorded: September 1999
- Studio: Undisclosed location (New York City)
- Genre: Dance-pop
- Length: 4:33
- Label: Maverick; Warner Bros.
- Songwriter: Don McLean
- Producers: Madonna; William Orbit

Madonna singles chronology
"Beautiful Stranger" (1999)	"American Pie" (2000)	"Music" (2000)

Music video
- "American Pie" on YouTube

=== Background and release ===
American singer Madonna recorded a cover version of "American Pie" for the soundtrack of her film The Next Best Thing (2000). Her cover is much shorter than the original, containing only the beginning of the first verse and all of the second and sixth verses. Reworked as a dance-pop track, it was produced by Madonna and William Orbit. It was recorded in September 1999 in New York City, after Rupert Everett, Madonna's co-star in The Next Best Thing, convinced her to cover the song for the film's soundtrack. Madonna said of her choice to cover the song: "To me, it's a real millennium song. We're going through a big change in terms of the way we view pop culture, because of the Internet. In a way, it's like saying goodbye to music as we knew it—and to pop culture as we knew it." "American Pie" was released as the lead single from The Next Best Thing on February 8, 2000, by Maverick Records and Warner Bros. Records.

"American Pie" was later included as an international bonus track on her eighth studio album, Music (2000). However, it was not included on her greatest hits compilation GHV2 (2001), as Madonna had regretted putting it on Music, elaborating: "It was something a certain record company executive twisted my arm into doing, but it didn't belong on the album so now it's being punished... My gut told me not to [put the song on Music], but I did it and then I regretted it so just for that reason it didn't deserve a place on GHV2". A remix of the song was featured on her remix compilation album Finally Enough Love: 50 Number Ones (2022).

=== Reception ===
"American Pie" was an international hit, reaching number one in numerous countries, including the United Kingdom, Australia, Iceland, Mexico, Italy, Germany, Switzerland, Austria and Finland. The song was the 19th-best-selling single of 2000 in the UK and the ninth best-selling single of 2000 in Sweden. The single was not released commercially in the United States, but it reached number 29 on the Billboard Hot 100 due to strong radio airplay.

Despite the commercial success, the cover received mixed reviews from music critics. Chuck Taylor of Billboard was impressed by the recording and commented, "Applause to Madonna for not pandering to today's temporary trends and for challenging programmers to broaden their playlists. ... In all, a fine preview of the forthcoming soundtrack to The Next Best Thing." Peter Robinson of The Guardian called the cover as "brilliant". Don McLean himself praised the cover, saying it was "a gift from a goddess", and that her version is "mystical and sensual". NME, on the other hand, gave it a negative review, saying that "Killdozer did it first and did it better", that it was "sub-karaoke fluff" and that "it's a blessing she didn't bother recording the whole thing." It was rated number 3 in both a 2011 Rolling Stone reader poll and a 2023 A.V. Club article ranking the worst cover songs of all time. It was the only song to appear in the top five on both lists.

In 2017, the Official Charts Company stated the song had sold 400,000 copies in the United Kingdom and was her 16th best selling single to date in the nation.

=== Music video ===
The music video, filmed in the southern United States and in London, and directed by Philipp Stölzl, depicts a diverse array of ordinary Americans, including scenes showing same-sex couples kissing. Throughout the music video Madonna, who is wearing a tiara on her head, dances and sings in front of a large American flag.

Two versions of the video were produced, the first of which was released as the official video worldwide, and later appeared on Madonna's Celebration: The Video Collection (2009). The second version used the "Humpty Remix", a more upbeat and dance-friendly version of the song. The latter aired on MTV in the US to promote The Next Best Thing; it features different footage and new outtakes of the original while omitting the lesbian kiss. Everett, who provides backing vocals in the song, is also featured in the video.

=== Formats and track listings ===
- French and Benelux 2-track CD single; UK and New Zealand cassette single
1. "American Pie" (album version) – 4:33
2. "American Pie" (Richard "Humpty" Vission Radio Mix) – 4:29
- Asian, Canadian, European and South African CD maxi-single
1. "American Pie" (album version) – 4:33
2. "American Pie" (Richard "Humpty" Vission Radio Mix) – 4:29
3. "American Pie" (Victor Calderone Filter Dub Mix) – 6:06
4. "American Pie" (Richard "Humpty" Vission Visits Madonna) – 5:44
- Australian, European, Japanese and UK CD 1 maxi-single
1. "American Pie" (album version) – 4:33
2. "American Pie" (Victor Calderone Filter Dub Mix) – 6:06
3. "American Pie" (Victor Calderone Vocal Dub Mix) – 6:16
- Australian, European and UK CD 2 maxi-single
1. "American Pie" (album version) – 4:33
2. "American Pie" (Richard "Humpty" Vission Radio Mix) – 4:29
3. "American Pie" (Richard "Humpty" Vission Visits Madonna) – 5:44
- European CD 3 maxi-single
1. "American Pie" (Victor Calderone Vocal Club Mix) – 9:07
2. "American Pie" (Victor Calderone Extended Vocal Club Mix) – 10:36
3. "American Pie" (Richard "Humpty" Vission Visits Madonna) – 5:44
4. "American Pie" (Richard "Humpty" Vission Radio Mix) – 4:29
5. "American Pie" (album version) – 4:33
- Japanese CD 2 maxi-single
1. "American Pie" (Richard "Humpty" Vission Visits Madonna) – 5:44
2. "American Pie" (Richard "Humpty" Vission Radio Mix) – 4:29
3. "American Pie" (Victor Calderone Vocal Club Mix) – 9:07
4. "American Pie" (Victor Calderone Extended Vocal Club Mix) – 10:36
5. "American Pie" (album version) – 4:33
- European and UK 12-inch vinyl
1. "American Pie" (Victor Calderone Filter Dub Mix) – 6:06
2. "American Pie" (Victor Calderone Vocal Dub Mix) – 6:16
3. "American Pie" (Richard "Humpty" Vission Visits Madonna) – 5:44
4. "American Pie" (album version) – 4:33
- European 12-inch vinyl (remixes)
1. "American Pie" (Victor Calderone Vocal Club Mix) – 9:07
2. "American Pie" (Victor Calderone Extended Vocal Club Mix) – 10:36
- Digital download (2022)
1. "American Pie" – 4:34
2. "American Pie" (Richard Humpty Vission Radio Mix) – 4:29
3. "American Pie" (Victor Calderone Vocal Club Mix) – 9:07
4. "American Pie" (Richard Humpty Vission Visits Madonna) – 5:43
5. "American Pie" (Victor Calderone Extended Vocal Club Mix) – 10:36
6. "American Pie" (Victor Calderone Vocal Dub Mix) – 6:15
7. "American Pie" (Victor Calderone Filter Dub Mix) – 6:06

=== Credits and personnel ===
Credits are adapted from the liner notes for "American Pie".

- Madonna – vocals, production
- William Orbit – production, guitar, drums, keyboard
- Don McLean – songwriting
- Mark "Spike" Stent – mixing
- Rupert Everett – backing vocals
- Mark Endert – engineering
- Sean Spuehler – engineering, programming
- Jake Davies – engineering
- Rico Conning – sequencer programming
- Dah Len – photography

=== Charts ===
==== Weekly charts ====
Weekly chart performance for "American Pie"
Chart (2000–2002)	Peak position
Australia (ARIA)	1
Austria (Ö3 Austria Top 40)	3
Belgium (Ultratop 50 Flanders)	6
Belgium (Ultratop 50 Wallonia)	7
Brazil (Crowley Broadcast Analysis)	9
Canada Top Singles (RPM)	4
Canada (Nielsen SoundScan)	1
Canada Adult Contemporary (RPM)	7
Canada Dance/Urban (RPM)	23
Canada CHR (Nielsen BDS)	4
Croatia (HRT)	9
Czech Republic (Rádio – Top 100)	1
Denmark (IFPI)	2
Eurochart Hot 100 (Music & Media)	1
European Radio Top 50 (Music & Media)	1
Finland (Suomen virallinen lista)	1
France (SNEP)	8
France Airplay (SNEP)	8
Germany (GfK)	1
Greece (IFPI)	3
Hungary (MAHASZ)	1
Hungary Airplay (HCRA)	1
Iceland (Íslenski Listinn Topp 40)	1
Ireland (IRMA)	2
Italy (FIMI)	1
Italy Airplay (Music & Media)	1
Japan (Oricon)	75
Netherlands (Dutch Top 40)	4
Netherlands (Single Top 100)	6
Netherlands Airplay (Aircheck Nederland)	1
New Zealand (Recorded Music NZ)	4
Norway (VG-lista)	1
Paraguay (Notimex)	2
Romania (Romanian Top 100)	1
Scottish Singles Sales (Official Charts)	1
Spain (Promusicae)	1
Sweden (Sverigetopplistan)	1
Switzerland (Schweizer Hitparade)	1
UK Singles (Official Charts)	1
UK Airplay (M&M)	18
US Billboard Hot 100	29
US Adult Contemporary (Billboard)	21
US Adult Pop Airplay (Billboard)	20
US Dance Club Songs (Billboard)	1
US Pop Airplay (Billboard)	16

==== Year-end charts ====
2000 year-end chart performance for "American Pie"
Chart	Position
Australia (ARIA)	66
Austria (Ö3 Austria Top 40)	32
Belgium (Ultratop 50 Flanders)	46
Belgium (Ultratop 50 Wallonia)	44
Denmark (IFPI)	7
Eurochart Hot 100 (Music & Media)	11
France (SNEP)	44
Germany (Media Control)	16
Iceland (Íslenski Listinn Topp 40)	16
Ireland (IRMA)	38
Netherlands (Dutch Top 40)	42
Netherlands (Single Top 100)	46
Norway Spring Period (VG-lista)	5
Romania (Romanian Top 100)	50
Spain (AFYVE)	10
Sweden (Hitlistan)	9
Switzerland (Schweizer Hitparade)	11
UK Singles (OCC)	19
US Adult Top 40 (Billboard)	72
US Dance Club Play (Billboard)	37
US Mainstream Top 40 (Billboard)	88

2001 year-end chart performance for "American Pie"
Chart	Position
Canada (Nielsen SoundScan)	78

2002 year-end chart performance for "American Pie"
Chart	Position
Canada (Nielsen SoundScan)	116

=== Certifications ===
Certifications and sales for "American Pie"
Region	Certification	Certified units/sales
Australia (ARIA)	Gold	35,000^{^}
Austria (IFPI Austria)	Gold	25,000^{*}
Belgium (BRMA)	Gold	25,000^{*}
Denmark	—	12,701
France (SNEP)	Gold	250,000^{*}
Germany (BVMI)	Gold	250,000^{^}
Italy	—	70,000
Spain	—	35,000
Sweden (GLF)	Platinum	30,000^{^}
Switzerland (IFPI Switzerland)	Gold	25,000^{^}
United Kingdom (BPI)	Gold	400,000
^{*} Sales figures based on certification alone.^{^} Shipments figures based on certification alone.

=== Release history ===
Release dates and formats for "American Pie"
Region	Date	Format(s)	Label(s)	Ref.
United States	February 8, 2000	Contemporary hit radio	Maverick; Warner Bros.	
France	February 25, 2000	12-inch vinyl; CD	Maverick	
Germany	February 28, 2000	Maxi CD	Warner Music	
United Kingdom	February 28, 2000	Cassette; maxi CD (Note: In Australia and the UK, "American Pie" was made available in two maxi CD variants.)	Maverick; Warner Bros.	
Australia	March 7, 2000	Maxi CD	Warner Music	
Japan	March 8, 2000	Maxi CD	Warner Music	

== See also ==
- List of Australian chart achievements and milestones
- List of Romanian Top 100 number ones of the 2000s
- List of best-selling singles by year (Germany)
