= Eddy Howard =

American singer and bandleader (1914–1963)

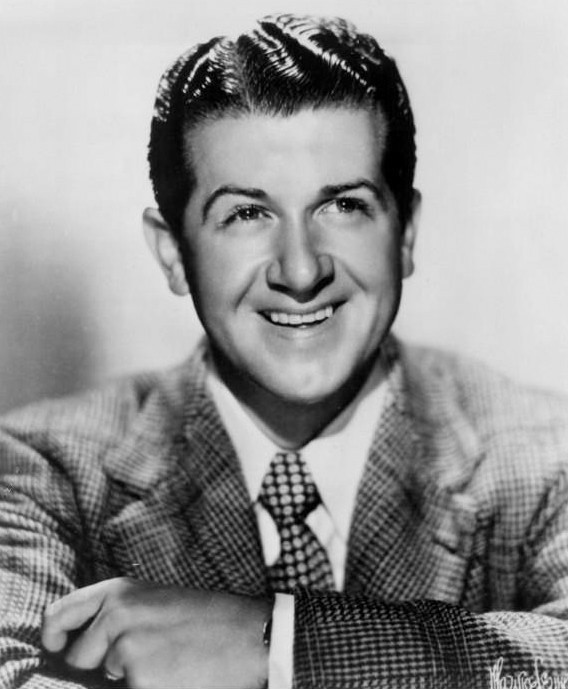
- Howard in 1960

Background information
- Born: Edward Evan Duncan Howard; September 12, 1914; Woodland, California, U.S.
- Died: May 23, 1963 (aged 48) Palm Desert, California, U.S.
- Occupations: Vocalist, bandleader
- Labels: Mercury Records, Majestic Records

Edward Evan Duncan Howard (September 12, 1914 – May 23, 1963) was an American vocalist and bandleader who was popular during the 1940s and 1950s,

== Early years ==
Eddy Howard was born in Woodland, California, and after attending San Jose State College from 1931 to 1933, studied medicine at Stanford University before dropping out to become a singer of romantic ballads on Los Angeles radio. Later he sang with bands led by Ben Bernie and Dick Jurgens. His hits with Jurgens included "My Last Goodbye" and "Careless", which became his theme.

== Career ==
Howard was a singer on a radio programme on NBC in 1938.

In 1939, Howard started his own band, and he was the regular vocalist on It Can Be Done, Edgar A. Guest's 1941 radio programme on the Blue Network, from Wednesday to Friday.

The first No. 1 single for Howard and his Orchestra, "To Each His Own", spent five non-consecutive weeks at the top of the U.S. pop chart in 1946. The song was a tie-in with the 1946 Paramount film, To Each His Own, which brought Academy Awards for Olivia de Havilland and screenwriter Charles Brackett. The recording by Howard was released by Majestic Records as catalog number 7188 and 1070. It first reached the Billboard chart on July 11, 1946 and spent a total of 19 weeks on the chart. The recording sold over two million copies by 1957, and was awarded a gold disc by the RIAA.

Howard's orchestra was heard on The Gay Mrs. Featherstone on NBC (April 18 - October 10, 1945) and on NBC's The Sheaffer Parade, sponsored by Sheaffer Pens (September 14, 1947 - September 5, 1948).

In 1949, Howard signed to Mercury Records. His popularity continued into the 1950s with tracks such as "Maybe It's Because", and "(It's No) Sin", which became Howard's second No. 1 tune, sold over one million copies, and was awarded a gold disc. It was also a million selling hit for The Four Aces. Howard's last hit was "The Teen-Ager's Waltz", which peaked at No. 90 on the Billboard Top 100 chart in 1955. In 1952–1953 he was heard on CBS on Thursday nights at 10:45pm, with further broadcasts on Tuesdays at 10pm in 1955–1956. The rise of rock music led to a decline in Howard's popularity.

In a change of roles, Howard was the host on Just for You, an hour-long variety program on NBC in 1954. The staff orchestra of WMAQ provided the music.

Howard's star rose again during the 1960s, as part of the revival of interest in Big Band music and old-time radio that was collectively called "Nostalgia" in popular culture. Howard went into semi-retirement and his some-time saxophonist, vocalist-bandleader Norman Lee, procured the rights to use the Eddy Howard Orchestra name and the band's arrangements. Lee and the Orchestra became a dance-band staple throughout the U.S. Midwest. Based out of Wichita, Kansas, they toured extensively and recorded on their own label, Marian Records. By the late 1960s, Lee dropped the Eddy Howard name and led the orchestra under his own moniker, though several Howard standards remained featured in their repertoire. The organization dissolved in the wake of the murder of Lee and his wife by one of the band's former trumpet players on December 6, 1978.

== Recognition ==
Howard has a star in the Recording section of the Hollywood Walk of Fame at 6724 Hollywood Boulevard. It was dedicated on February 8, 1960.

== Death ==
Howard died in his sleep of a cerebral hemorrhage in May 1963, in Palm Desert, California, aged 48. He was buried at Desert Memorial Park in Cathedral City, California.

== Discography ==
=== Singles ===
Year	Title	Chart positions
Year	Title	US
1940	"Orchids for Remembrance"	21
1942	"Miss You"	21
1946	"To Each His Own"	1
1946	"The Rickety Rickshaw Man"	6
1946	"(I Love You) For Sentimental Reasons"	2
1946	"My Best to You"	17
1947	"The Girl That I Marry"	23
1947	"My Adobe Hacienda"	2
1947	"Heartaches"	11
1947	"I Wonder, I Wonder, I Wonder"	2
1947	"Ragtime Cowboy Joe"	16
1947	"Kate (Have I Come Too Early, Too Late)"	7
1947	"An Apple Blossom Wedding"	9
1948	"Now Is the Hour (Maori Farewell Song)"	8
1948	"Just Because"	20
1948	"Put 'em in a Box, Tie 'em with a Ribbon, and Throw 'em in the Deep Blue Sea"	23
1948	"On a Slow Boat to China"	6
1948	"Dainty Brenda Lee"	27
1949	"Candy Kisses"	20
1949	"Love Me! Love Me! Love Me!"	24
1949	"Red Head"	29
1949	"Room Full of Roses"	4
1949	"Yes, Yes, in Your Eyes"	21
1949	"Maybe It's Because"	9
1949	"Tell Me Why"	25
1950	"Half a Heart Is All You Left Me (When You Broke My Heart in Two)"	28
1950	"Rag Mop"	24
1950	"American Beauty Rose"	21
1950	"To Think You've Chosen Me"	9
1951	"A Penny a Kiss-A Penny a Hug"	14
1951	"The Strange Little Girl"	28
1951	"What Will I Tell My Heart"	27
1951	"(A Woman Is a) Deadly Weapon"	22
1951	"(It's No) Sin"	1
1952	"Stolen Love"	11
1952	"Wishin'"	17
1952	"Be Anything (But Be Mine)"	7
1952	"Auf Wiederseh'n Sweetheart"	4
1952	"Mademoiselle"	14
1952	"I Don't Want to Take a Chance"	26
1952	"It's Worth Any Price You Pay"	11
1953	"Gomen-nasai"	17
1954	"Melancholy Me"	16
1955	"The Teen-Ager's Waltz"	90

== Bibliography ==
- Who's Who in America, Volume 26. Chicago: A.N. Marquis Company, 1950. ASIN B000GDEIKE
