= Norman Lee =

Norman Lee may refer to:

- Norman Lee (director), British film director
- Norm Lee, Australian politician
- Norman Lee (musician), American songwriter, jazz clarinetist, and big band singer
