= I Only Know I Love You =

Single by The Four Aces

from the album The Four Aces Sing
- B-side: "Dreamer"
- Released: June 16, 1956
- Recorded: 1956
- Genre: Traditional pop
- Length: 2:56
- Label: Decca
- Songwriter(s): Carlo Alberto Rossi, Al Stillman, Ugo Calise

The Four Aces singles chronology
| "To Love Again" (1956) | "I Only Know I Love You" (1956) | "Dreamer" (1956) |

"I Only Know I Love You" is a 1956 popular song produced by Carlo Alberto Rossi, Al Stillman, and Ugo Calise and performed by the Four Aces, whose version peaked at No. 22 on the Billboard Top 100 singles chart. The single was released on the B side of the record with the A side containing A Woman in Love.

== Weekly charts ==
| Chart (1956) | Peak position |
|---|---|
| US Billboard Top 100 | 22 |
