= Trilling =

Trilling is a surname. Notable people with the surname include:

- Daniel Trilling, British journalist
- Diana Trilling (1905–1996), American literary critic
- George Trilling (1930–2020), American physicist
- Ilia Trilling (1895–1947), Yiddish song composer
- Lawrence Trilling (born 1966), American television director
- Leon Trilling (1924–2018), American aeronautical engineer and historian of technology
- Lionel Trilling (1905–1975), US literary critic

== See also ==
- Drilling
