= Nick Noble =

Nick Noble may refer to:

- Nick Noble (soccer)
- Nick Noble (singer)
