= (It's No) Sin =

1951 popular song

"Sin (It's No Sin)"

Single by Eddy Howard
- B-side: "My Wife and I"
- Released: 1951
- Recorded: 1951
- Genre: Traditional pop
- Length: 2:46
- Label: Mercury
- Songwriter(s): George Hoven, Chester R. Shull

Eddy Howard singles chronology
| "(A Woman Is a) Deadly Weapon" (1951) | "Sin (It's No Sin)" (1951) | "Stolen Love" (1952) |

"(It's No) Sin" is a popular song with music by George Hoven and lyrics by Chester R. Shull. It was a No. 1 song on Billboard charts released by Eddy Howard in 1951. This song should not be confused with "It's a Sin", another popular song of the same era.

== Lyrics ==
The song is about someone whose love interest is leaving, but who insists that it's no sin to keep on loving the person forever.

== First recordings ==
"(It's No) Sin"

Single by The Four Aces
- Released: 1951
- Recorded: 1951
- Genre: Vocal pop
- Length: 3:05
- Label: Victoria
- Songwriter(s): George Hoven, Chester R. Shull

The most popular recordings of the song were made by The Four Aces and Eddy Howard, both top 10 hits in 1951.

The recording by Eddy Howard was released by Mercury Records (catalog number 5711). It first reached the Billboard chart on September 14, 1951, and lasted 23 weeks on the chart, peaking at number 1, staying there for eight weeks. It also reached No. 1 on Cashbox for a week. It was ranked No. 4 on Billboard's 1951 year-end chart.

The recording by The Four Aces was released by Victoria Records (catalog number 101). It first reached the Billboard chart on September 7, 1951, and lasted 22 weeks on the chart, peaking at number 4. This was The Four Aces' first charting record, and led to their receiving a contract with a major company, Decca. It was ranked No. 31 for 1951.

The song was the No. 1 song on Your Hit Parade for seven weeks.

== Other contemporary recordings ==
A number of artists also recorded and released the song in 1951. The Four Knights and Savannah Churchill both peaked in the chart the same week as Eddy Howard in November 1951; The Four Knights reaching No. 14 while Savannah Churchill reached No. 5. Churchill's recordings was also ranked No. 39 on Billboard's 1951 year chart.

Coleman Hawkins recorded it in October 1951 and Sidney Bechet recorded it with his All-Stars in January 1952 (entitled It's No Sin (Est-Ce Un Peche?)). Knud Pfeiffer wrote the Danish lyrics. The Danish title is "Er det synd". Raquel Rastenni with Radiodansekorkesteret recorded it in Copenhagen in 1952. The song was released on a 78 rpm record by His Master's Voice (X 8043).

== Later recordings ==
"(It's No) Sin"

Single by The Duprees

from the album You Belong to Me
- B-side: "The Sand and the Sea"
- Released: 1964
- Recorded: 1963
- Genre: Doo-wop
- Length: 2:35
- Label: Sundazed
- Songwriter(s): George Hoven, Chester R. Shull

The Duprees singles chronology
| "Why Don't You Believe Me" (1963) | "(It's No) Sin" (1964) | "Check Yourself" (1970) |

- The song was revived in 1964 by The Duprees, a group that made a number of recordings of 1950s hits. This version peaked at No. 74 on the US Hot 100.
- Ronnie Dove released a country version of the song for Decca Records in 1972.
