= Toni Arden =

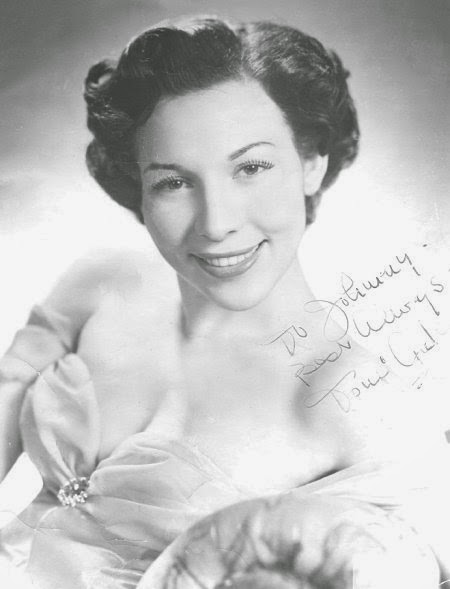
- Born: Antoinette Ardizzone; February 15, 1924; Manhattan, New York City
- Died: May 29, 2012 (aged 88); Lake Worth, Florida
- Occupations: Actress, singer
- Parents: Phillip Ardizzone; Sabina Ardizzone
- Relatives: Jan Arden (brother)

Antoinette Ardizzone (February 15, 1924 – May 29, 2012), known professionally as Toni Arden, was an American traditional pop singer. Often described as "a little girl with a big voice", Arden enjoyed a long and productive career of recording and performing, which began when she was 15 years old and continued into the new millennium.

== Early life ==
Arden was born in New York City, the youngest of three children to Phillip Ardizzone, a singer from Milano with the Metropolitan Opera and La Scala and Sabina Ardizzone, originally from Palermo. Her brother, Jan Arden, was also a singer. The siblings teamed up for night club performances in the late 1950s. Her parents met in Italy before emigrating to the United States, where they settled in Greenwich Village, New York City, to raise their family. Arden grew up in a musical household.

== Career ==
Arden was primarily known as a big band singer in the 1940s, singing with musicians such as Al Trace, Joe Reichman, Ray Bloch and Shep Fields. Vic Damone called her "the greatest girl singer in the world." Frank Sinatra called her "a singer's singer."

=== Recording ===
Arden started recording as a soloist in 1946 for the minor National Records company. After her appearance on the early television talent series Doorway to Fame, Arden signed her first solo recording contract with a major record label, Columbia Records, in 1949 (Arden was arguably the only performer out of 20,000 over Doorway to Fame's two-year run on air to become relatively famous); at Columbia, she had several hits including "I Can Dream, Can't I?" (which reached No. 7 on the Billboard charts), "Too Young" (which reached No. 15), "Kiss of Fire" (which reached No. 14), and "I'm Yours" (which reached No. 24). CD compilations of these earlier recordings can be found on the Sepia Records label and a two-CD set released by Jasmine Records. Her recording of "Too Young" was used in the soundtrack of the 1952 Akira Kurosawa film Ikiru.

In the mid-1950s, Arden signed with Decca Records, where her biggest selling record (her only million-seller) was "Padre" in 1958, which peaked at No. 13. LP albums included Miss Toni Arden, Besame! Toni in Latin America, Sing a Song of Italy and Italian Gold. She sang in both Italian and English. The first two albums were compiled on a second CD by the Sepia Records label. She also recorded briefly for RCA Victor and Mercury Records. Her last album, released in 1981 titled My World is You (on GPRT Records), featured the compositions of Gladys Shelley.

=== Radio ===
In 1952, Arden appeared in episode 55 of the Big Show with Tallulah Bankhead. In 1954, Arden recorded 13 radio programs for the US Marine Corps via electrical transcription. The Toni Arden Show was broadcast on participating local stations. In 1956, she was featured on an episode of What's New in Music on CBS.

=== Television ===
Arden made guest appearances on numerous television variety shows during the 1950s and early 1960s, primarily as a performer singing her popular songs. Arden appeared on The Bing Crosby Show, The Music of George Gershwin, This Is Show Business, The Dick Clark Show, and The Jimmy Dean Show. She and her brother Jan sang two duets on The Ed Sullivan Show in 1949, 1952, and 1959. She also appeared on television programs such as The Dinah Shore Show and The Guy Lombardo Show in 1955. She also appeared on The Merv Griffin Show in 1962.

== Filmography ==
- Sunny Side of the Street (1951, performer: "I May Be Wrong (But I Think You're Wonderful)")
- Carnival in April (1953 short film, performer: "I'll Remember April", "I'm Shooting High")
- Senior Prom (1958, singer)

== Discography ==
- 1955 Shep Fields and his Orchestra with Toni Arden (Royale, 18142)
- 1958 Miss Toni Arden (Decca Records, DL 8651)
- 1958 Sing a Song of Italy (Decca Records, DL 8765)
- 1959 Besame! Toni in Latin America (Decca Records, DL 8875)
- 1959 The Exciting Toni Arden (Harmony, HL 7212)
- 1963 Italian Gold (Decca Records, DL 4375)
- 1964 Stars for Defense (Office of Civil Defense)
- 1968 The Life of Christ (Manor Records, MRS 201)
- 2004 Al Trace and his Musicians featuring Toni Arden (Circle Records, CCD-109)
- 2005 I Can Dream, Can't I? (Jasmine Records, JASCD 644)
- 2005 This Is Toni Arden (Sepia Records, SEPIA 1050)
- 2012 Besame! (Sepia Records, SEPIA 1188)
- 2021 The Toni Arden Collection 1944-61 (Acrobat Music, ADDCD3375)
- Toni Arden In American Love Songs (Tiara Records, TST 525)
- The Bing Crosby Show (Redmond Nostalgia, CD-172)

== Compilation albums ==
- 1957 Meet the Girls (Halo, 50254), "Two Loves" , "Let's Be Sweethearts Again"
- 1959 The Girl Friends (Harmony, HL 7148), "A Little Love a Little Kiss", "I Can Dream, Can't I?"
- America's Sweethearts featuring Kitty Kallen, Toni Arden, Fran Warren (Viking, VK 019)
- The Girl Friends (American Radio Transcription Library, A.R.T. 118), "All of Me"
- American Vocal Parade II (Philips, B 07643 R), "F'r Instance"
- Music from Latin America (Decca Records, DL 38078), "Medley: La Paloma, La Golondrina"
- Buitoni Presents Souvenir of Italy (Decca Records, DL 38291), "Medley: Vieni su - Vicini u mare - Drigo's Serenade", "Fa la nana bambin"

== Death ==
She died at her home in Lake Worth, Florida, on May 29, 2012 at the age of 88.
