= Victoria Records =

Victoria Records was the name of record labels:

- Victoria Records (1951) - a Philadelphia, Pennsylvania-based company.
- Victoria Records (2000) - a Philadelphia, Pennsylvania-based company.
- Victoria Records (2015) - a Monterrey, Mexico-based company.

== See also ==
- List of record labels
