= The Four Aces =

American male traditional pop quartet

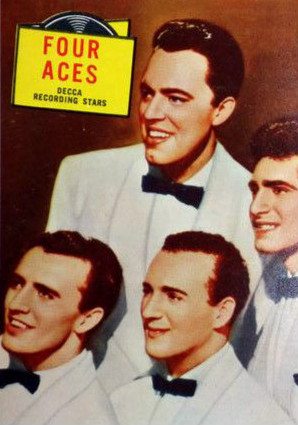
- The Four Aces in 1957

Background information
- Origin: Chester, Pennsylvania, U.S.
- Genres: Traditional pop
- Years active: 1949–1987
- Labels: Victoria; Decca; MCA
- Past members: Al Alberts; Lou Silvestri; Dave Mahoney; Rosario "Sod" Vaccaro; Fred Diodati; Joe Giglio; Danny Colingo; Bob Barboni; Harry Heisler; Tony Alesi
- Website: thefouraces.org

The Four Aces are an American male traditional pop quartet popular since the 1950s. Over the last half-century, the group amassed many gold records. Its million-selling songs include "Love is a Many-Splendored Thing", "Three Coins in the Fountain", "Stranger in Paradise", "Tell Me Why", and "(It's No) Sin". Other big sellers included "Shangri-La", "Perfidia", "Sincerely", and "Written On The Wind". “Love Is A Many Splendored Thing” won the Academy Award for Best Song in 1955. The original members, responsible for every song made popular by the group, included Al Alberts, Dave Mahoney, Lou Silvestri, and Rosario "Sod" Vaccaro.

== Career ==
Alberts went to South Philadelphia High School and Temple University and served in the United States Navy, where he met Mahoney. Originally, Alberts sang with Mahoney playing behind him, and later they added Vaccaro on trumpet and Silvestri on drums. They played locally in the Philadelphia area, and Alberts started his own record label, Victoria Records, when they could not find a distributor to release their first record, "(It's No) Sin". It sold a million copies, and Decca Records soon signed the group, billing them as The Four Aces featuring Al Alberts.

Alberts left the group in 1958 to try to make it as a soloist but never made the charts. He was replaced as lead singer by Fred Diodati, who had attended South Philadelphia High School a few years after Alberts. After Alberts had left the group, Mahoney and Vaccaro also left. Silvestri never left the group but led three new members: Diodati, Tony Alesi, and Joe Giglio. The Original Aces later asked Silvestri to rejoin the original group, and he did.

It was then that Diodati led a new line-up, which consisted of Diodati, Alesi, Giglio, and Harry Heisler. After almost 19 years with the group, Alesi developed a medical condition that forced him to leave the group. As of 2013 the Four Aces members were Diodati, Giglio, Heisler, and Danny Colingo. By 2019 Heisler had been replaced by Bob Barboni.

In 1975, Diodati, Alesi, Giglio, and Heisler were awarded the right to the name in a court suit in which the original members tried to re-establish their right. The court allowed the founding members to tour as "The Original Four Aces, Featuring Al Alberts", which they did, finally retiring the act in 1987. Diodati, Giglio, Barboni, and Colingo continue to legally use the name of the Four Aces and perform the songs made popular by the Original Four Aces.

The founding lead singer, Alberts, died of natural causes on November 27, 2009, at age 87. Mahoney died on July 12, 2012, of complications from Alzheimer's disease at age 86. Silvestri died on January 27, 2013, at age 86. Vaccaro (born in 1922) died on April 5, 2013, at age 90.

== Singles ==
Year	Single (A-side, B-side) Both sides from same album except where indicated	Chart positions			Album
Year	Single (A-side, B-side) Both sides from same album except where indicated	US	CB	UK	Album
1949	"Baby, wha hoppen" b/w "Try, try again"	—	—	—	Non-album tracks
1951	"(It's No) Sin" b/w "Arizona Moon"	4	1	—	Non-album tracks
1951	"There's a Christmas Tree in Heaven" b/w "There's a Small Hotel"	—	—	—	Non-album tracks
1951	"Tell Me Why" /	2	2	—	Sentimental Souvenirs
1952	"A Garden in the Rain"	14	17	—	The Four Aces Sing
1952	"Perfidia" b/w "You Brought Me Love" (Non-album track)	7	7	—	Sentimental Souvenirs
1952	"Two Little Kisses" b/w "Who's to Blame"	29	34	—	Non-album tracks
1952	"My Hero" b/w "Spring Is a Wonderful Thing" (Non-album track)	—	20	—	Sentimental Souvenirs
1952	"I'm Yours" b/w "I Understand" (from Sentimental Souvenirs)	21	—	—	Heart and Soul
1952	"Should I" b/w "There's Only Tonight" (Non-album track)	9	16	—	The Four Aces Sing
1952	"Heart and Soul" /	11	14	—	Heart and Soul
1952	"Just Squeeze Me"	20	—	—	Heart and Soul
1953	"Ti-Pi-Tin" b/w "Heaven Can Wait"	—	—	—	Heart and Soul
1953	"La Rosita" b/w "Take Me in Your Arms"	24	—	—	Heart and Soul
1953	"I'll Never Smile Again" b/w "My Devotion"	21	—	—	Heart and Soul
1953	"You Fooled Me" b/w "If You Take My Heart Away"	22	32	—	Non-album tracks
1953	"Organ Grinder's Swing" /	17	18	—	Heart and Soul
1953	"Honey in the Horn"	24	23	—	The Four Aces Sing
1953	"False Love" b/w "Don't Forget Me"	24	23	—	Non-album tracks
1953	"Laughing on the Outside (Crying on the Inside)" b/w "I've Been Waiting a Lifetime" (Non-album track)	22	28	—	The Four Aces Sing
1953	"Stranger in Paradise" /	3	1	6^{*}	Mood for Love
1953	"The Gang That Sang Heart of My Heart"	7	5	—	Sentimental Souvenirs
1954	"Bandera (Texas Polka)" (Al Alberts solo) b/w "What More Is There" (Al Alberts solo)	—	—	—	Non-album tracks
1954	"Amor" /	21	20	—	Heart and Soul
1954	"So Long"	26	20	—	Heart and Soul
1954	"Three Coins in the Fountain" /	1	1	5	Mood for Love
1954	"Wedding Bells (Are Breaking Up That Old Gang of Mine)"	22	18	—	Sentimental Souvenirs
1954	"Dream" /	17	13	—	Sentimental Souvenirs
1954	"It Shall Come to Pass"	—	37	—	Non-album Track
1954	"It's a Woman's World" b/w "That Cuckoo Bird in the Pickle Tree"	11	15	—	The Four Aces Sing
1954	"Mr. Sandman" b/w "(I'll Be with You) In Apple Blossom Time"	5	1	9	Sentimental Souvenirs
1955	"Melody of Love" b/w "There Is a Tavern in the Town" (from Sentimental Souvenirs)	3	1	—	Mood for Love
1955	"There Goes My Heart" b/w "You'll Always Be the One" (Non-album track)	—	15	—	Mood for Love
1955	"Heart" b/w "Sluefoot" (Non-album track)	13	12	—	The Best of The Four Aces
1955	"Love Is a Many-Splendored Thing" /	1	1	2	Hits from Hollywood
1955	"Shine On Harvest Moon"	—	45	—	Non-album Track
1955	"The Christmas Song" b/w "Jingle Bells"	—	—	—	Merry Christmas
1955	"O Holy Night" b/w "Silent Night"	—	—	—	Merry Christmas
1955	"A Woman in Love" /	14	16	19	Hits from Hollywood
1955	"Of This I'm Sure"	56	47	—	Non-album tracks
1956	"If You Can Dream" /	62	34	—	Non-album tracks
1956	"The Gal with the Yaller Shoes"	91	—	—	Non-album tracks
1956	"To Love Again" b/w "Charlie Was a Boxer" (from The Four Aces Sing)	43	26	—	Non-album tracks
1956	"I Only Know I Love You" /	22	38	—	The Four Aces Sing
1956	"Dreamer"	86	43	—	Non-album track
1956	"You Can't Run Away from It" /	20	—	—	The Four Aces Sing
1956	"Friendly Persuasion (Thee I Love)"	45	10	29	Hits from Hollywood
1956	"Someone To Love" /	47	—	—	The Four Aces Sing
1956	"Written on the Wind"	61	39	—	Hits from Hollywood
1957	"Bahama Mama" /	53	36	—	Beyond the Blue Horizon
1957	"You're Mine"	76	45	—	The Four Aces Sing
1957	"Yes Sir, That's My Baby" b/w "Three Sheets to the Wind" (from The Four Aces Sing)	—	—	—	Non-album tracks
1957	"Half of My Heart" b/w "When My Sugar Walks Down the Street"	—	—	—	Non-album tracks
1957	"How Do You Say Goodbye" b/w "I Would Love You Still"	—	—	—	Non-album tracks
1958	"Rock and Roll Rhapsody" b/w "×I Wish I May, I Wish I Might"	66	—	—	Non-album tracks
1958	"Saturday Swing-Out" b/w "Take My Heart"	—	—	—	Non-album tracks
1958	"Heartache in Costume" b/w "Two Arms, Two Lips, One Heart"	—	—	—	Non-album tracks
1958	"Roses of Rio" b/w "Hangin' Up a Horseshoe"	—	89	—	Non-album tracks
1958	"The World Outside" b/w "How Can You Forget" (from Hits on Broadway)	63	25	18	Beyond the Blue Horizon
1958	"Ol' Fatso" b/w "Christmas Tree"	—	—	—	Non-album tracks
1959	"No Other Arms, No Other Lips" b/w "The Inn of the Sixth Happiness"	74	28	—	Non-album tracks
1959	"Ciao, Ciao, Bambino" b/w "Paradise Island" (from Beyond the Blue Horizon)	—	—	—	Non-album tracks
1959	"The Five Pennies" b/w "Anyone Would Love You" (from Hits from Broadway)	—	—	—	Non-album tracks
1959	"Waltzing Matilda" b/w "The Wonder of It All" (Non-album track)	—	—	—	Beyond the Blue Horizon
1959	"Til Tomorrow" b/w "I Love Paris" (from Beyond the Blue Horizon)	—	—	—	Non-album tracks
1960	"Poor Butterfly" b/w "You Are Music"	—	—	—	Non-album tracks
1960	"Dolce far niente" b/w "Searching"	—	—	—	Non-album tracks
1961	"The Ballad of Patrick Henry" b/w "Me Without You"	—	—	—	Non-album tracks
1962	"Lonely Hill" b/w "It's All Over but the Crying"	—	—	—	Non-album tracks
1963	"Marina" b/w "When Will You Come Back to Me"	—	—	—	Non-album tracks
1965	"Dans nos souvenir" b/w "Dis pourquoi"	—	—	—	Non-album tracks
1969	"Always Keep Me in Your Heart" b/w "Didn't We"	—	120	—	A Time for Us
1969	"I Started a Joke" b/w "Summer Won't Be Summer"	—	—	—	A Time for Us
"—" denotes releases that did not chart or not released in the territory

^{*} "Stranger in Paradise" charted in 1955 in the UK

== Awards and recognition ==
The Four Aces were inducted into the Vocal Group Hall of Fame in 2001. The Four Aces were inducted into the Philadelphia Music Alliance Walk of Fame in 1988.

== Other uses ==
In the 1930s a vocal group recorded under the name The Four Aces (A Human Orchestra). They vocalized not only the lyrics but all instrumental parts of their music, recording on the Decca label in the UK.

In 1948–49, Bill Haley fronted a group called the Four Aces of Western Swing – often referred to as simply The Four Aces. The style of music this group played was country and western, and it was with the group that Haley recorded his first singles for the Cowboy Records label in 1948. The group disbanded in 1949, and Haley went on to form The Saddlemen, which later became Bill Haley & His Comets.
