= Put 'Em in a Box, Tie 'Em with a Ribbon, and Throw 'Em in the Deep Blue Sea =

"Put 'Em in a Box, Tie 'eEm with a Ribbon, and Throw 'Em in the Deep Blue Sea" is a popular song. The music was written by Jule Styne, the lyrics by Sammy Cahn. The song was published in 1947, and was further popularized in the 1948 movie Romance on the High Seas, where it was sung by Doris Day accompanied by the Page Cavanaugh Trio. The lyrics deal with a person who is through with love and therefore metaphorically wants to throw everything away in a box into the sea.

Popular recordings in 1948 were by Doris Day; Eddy Howard & His Orchestra; and by Nat King Cole.

== Other recordings ==
- Frankie Laine- recorded for Mercury Records (catalog No. 5130) on December 1, 1947.
- Danny Kaye and the Andrews Sisters - recorded for Decca Records (catalog No. 24462B) on June 4, 1948.
- Hal McIntyre & His Orchestra - recorded for MGM Records (catalog No. 10193) (circa 1947/48).
- Ray McKinley & His Orchestra - recorded for RCA Victor (catalog No. 20-2873A) on December 28, 1947.
- Steve Lawrence - for his album Here's Steve Lawrence (1958).
- Scot Albertson - Got a Date with Fate (2004).
