= Hermann Heiss =

German composer

Hermann Heiss (29 December 1897 – 6 December 1966) was a German composer, pianist, and educator. His work was part of the music event in the art competition at the 1932 Summer Olympics.

== Life ==
Heiss was born in Darmstadt and studied composition first in Frankfurt with Bernhard Sekles in 1921, and then in Vienna with Josef Matthias Hauer from 1924 to 1926. After leaving Hauer's tutelage he returned to his native city to study the piano and compose. In 1928 he relocated to the island of Spiekeroog in the North Sea, where he taught music at the Hermann-Lietz-Schule Spiekeroog until 1933. He then moved to Berlin where he unsuccessfully sought performances of his works. During the war he composed music for the Luftwaffe and for other military groups (Dubinsky 2001). He was also self-taught. Hauer dedicated his book Twelve-Tone Technique (1925) to Heiss, who later claimed to have collaborated with Hauer on its contents (Dubinsky 2001). He introduced twelve-tone music at Darmstadt in 1946 (Dubinsky 2001) and composed electronic music at the Studio for Electronic Music (WDR) in Cologne in 1956, where his Elektronische Komposition I was performed and broadcast in a concert of the Musik der Zeit series on 30 May 1956. He then founded a studio of his own in Darmstadt (Morawska-Büngeler 1988, 26, 104, 115).

== Sources ==
- Dubinsky, Gregory S. 2001. "Heiss, Hermann". The New Grove Dictionary of Music and Musicians, second edition, edited by Stanley Sadie and John Tyrrell. London: Macmillan Publishers.
- Morawska-Büngeler, Marietta. 1988. Schwingende Elektronen: Eine Dkumentation über das Studio für Elektrnische Musik des Westdeutschen Rundfunks in Köln 1951–1986. Cologne-Rodenkirchen: P. J. Tonger Musikverlag.
