= Chart manipulation =

Music fraud method

Chart manipulation are methods of artificially inflating the numbers of streams, views, or sales of released music to appear higher in the rankings of music charts such as the Billboard Hot 100 and the UK singles chart.

Merchandise and concert ticket sales were previously used to manipulate rankings as a digital copies of records would be sold together with items. In October 2020, Billboard banned the practice, requiring music to be sold separately. Merch sales will continue to be reflected on Artist 100.

The International Federation of the Phonographic Industry maintains the "Anti-Stream Manipulation Code of Best Practice", an industry-wide agreement between labels, distributors, and streaming platforms. It asks streaming providers to mitigate and report stream manipulation.

== In Korea ==
In Korean, this is called 사재기 (sajaegi), literally "record hoarding".

In 2024, 11 officials of entertainment companies and public relations firms where indicted by the Seoul Central District Prosecutor of chart manipulating the rankings of songs by trot singers. The prosecutors claimed the individuals streamed 15 songs a total of 1,727,985 times across 500 virtual PCs, bulk-purchased IP addresses, and illegally obtained personal information.
