= Fred Diodati =

American singer

Fred Diodati is the lead singer of The Four Aces. He has intermittently been the lead singer of the Four Aces since 1958, when he replaced Al Alberts. He currently leads a band who refers to themselves as The Four Aces, though all of the songs he and his group sing originate from the Original Four Aces: Al Alberts, Lou Silvestri, Dave Mahoney, and Sod Vicarro.

Diodati was born in Chester, Pennsylvania and attended South Philadelphia High School.
