= Josef Matthias Hauer =

Austrian composer and music theorist

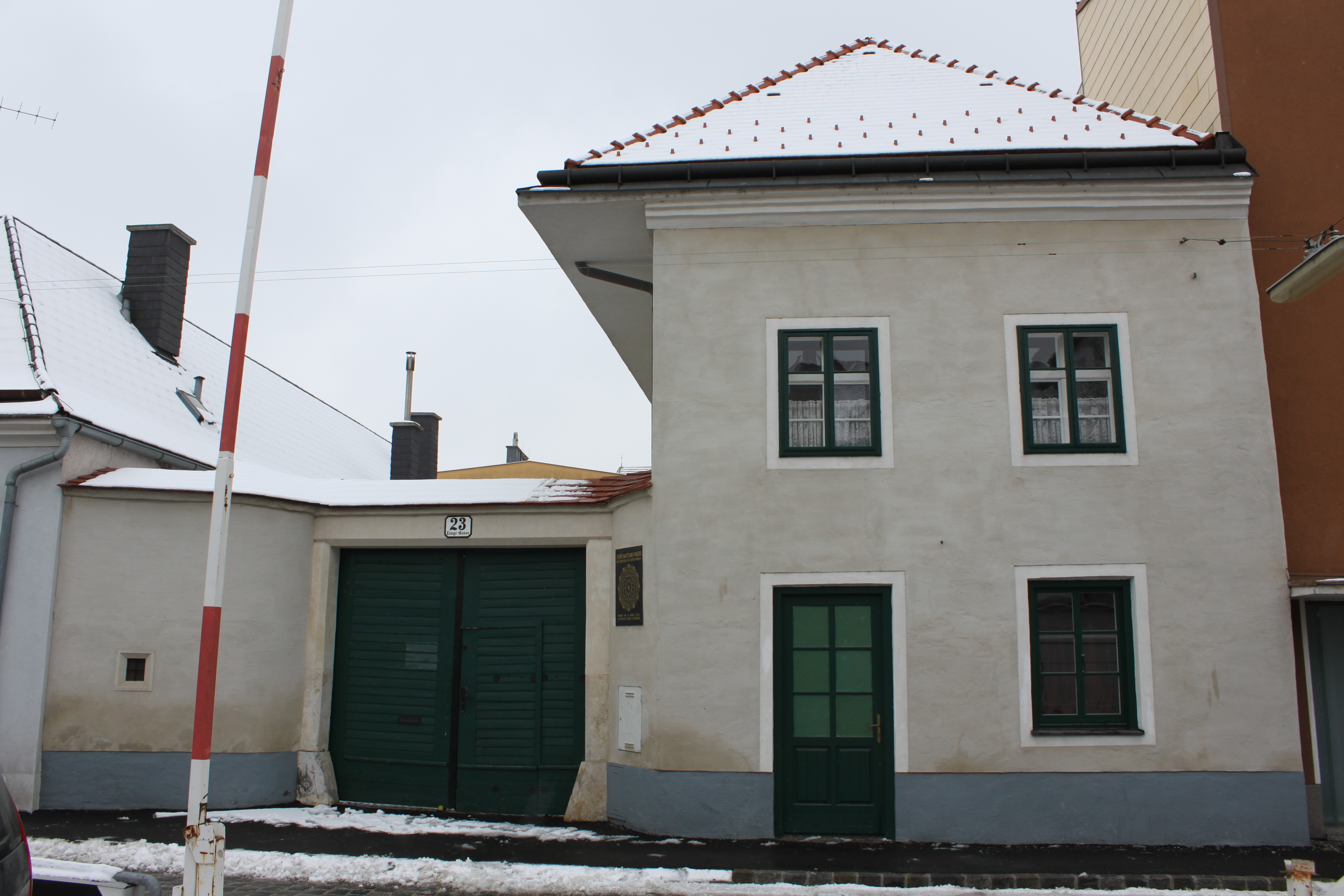
Hauer's birthplace in Wiener Neustadt

Josef Matthias Hauer's "athematic" dodecaphony in Nomos Op. 19

Josef Matthias Hauer (March 19, 1883 – September 22, 1959) was an Austrian composer and music theorist. He is best known for developing, independent of and a year or two before Arnold Schoenberg, a method for composing with all 12 notes of the chromatic scale. Hauer was also an important early theorist of twelve-tone music and composition.

Hauer believed that "the influence of the material world" interfered with "rais[ing] music to its highest, most spiritual level", and disapproved of expression of "ideas, programmes or feelings" in art, instead favoring "spiritual, supersensual music composed according to impersonal rules". Many of his compositions reflect this in their direct, often athematic, 'cerebral' approach. Hauer's music is diverse, however, and not all of it embraces this aesthetic position.

== Life ==
Hauer was born in Wiener Neustadt and died in Vienna. He had an early musical training in cello, choral conducting, and organ, and claimed to have been self-taught in theory and composition. In 1918, he published his first work on music theory (a tone-color theory based on Goethe's Theory of Colours). In August 1919, he published his "law of the twelve tones", requiring that all twelve chromatic notes sound before any is repeated. This he developed and first articulated theoretically in Vom Wesen des Musikalischen (1920), before the Schoenberg circle’s earliest writings on twelve-tone technique.

Hauer wrote prolifically, both music and prose, until 1938, when his music was added to the touring Nazi "degenerate art" (Entartete Kunst) exhibit. He stayed in Austria through the war, and, in fear, published nothing. Even after the war, however, he published little more, although it is thought that several hundred pieces remain in manuscript. Hauer continued to write twelve-tone pieces while also teaching several students his techniques and philosophy. At the time of his death, Hauer had reportedly given away most of his possessions, living simply while retaining a copy of the I Ching.

== Musical style ==
Hauer's compositional techniques are extraordinarily various and often change from one piece to the next. These range from building-block techniques to methods using a chord series that is generated out of the twelve-tone row ("Melos") to pieces employing an ordered row that is then subject to systematic permutation. The so-called 44 "tropes" and their compositional usage ("trope-technique") are essential to many of Hauer's twelve-tone techniques. In contrast to a twelve-tone row that contains a fixed succession of twelve tones, a trope consists of two complementary hexachords in which there is no fixed tone sequence. The tropes are used for structural and intervallic views on the twelve-tone system. Every trope offers certain symmetries that can be used by the composer. But Hauer also employed twelve-tone rows, using one row for a single piece and subjecting that row to a series of transformations, most notably rotation (keeping the order of the elements in a series fixed but reorganizing them so that they start somewhere in the middle and wrap back around to the beginning: A B C D . . . becomes C D . . . A B, for instance.

According to one scholar, Hauer's twelve-tone music was balanced between the "obligatory rule" that each composition follow an arrangement of the total chromatic: "the 'Constellation' or "Grundgestalt' ('basic shape')," and his often emphasized concept of tropes, or unordered arrangement of a pair of hexachords. This interpretation seems largely drawn from Hauer's theoretical writing of the early to mid-1920s in which he outlines these techniques. But a closer look at Hauer's compositional output reveals that a significant portion of his twelve-tone music from the 1920s and 1930s employs strictly ordered rows, as do the Zwölftonspiele (Twelve-tone pieces) that follow. Despite this, Hauer is often mentioned as the inventor of the tropes in contrast to Arnold Schoenberg and the Second Viennese School, who are thought of as advocates of Schoenberg's twelve-tone method. (In fact, many of the twelve-tone pieces by Schoenberg and his student Alban Berg do not strictly follow this method.)

After 1940, Hauer wrote exclusively Zwölftonspiele, designated sometimes by number, sometimes by date. He wrote about one thousand such pieces, most of which are lost. These pieces were all built on an ordered twelve-tone row, with the actual order often determined by chance. These pieces were not so much concert pieces as much as systematic and controlled meditations on the twelve tones—more a means than an end. Hauer believed that the twelve tempered tones provided access to the realm of the spiritual; meditating on the twelve tones was thus a prayerful act and not a public display of personal emotion or expression. In many ways Hauer's use of chance elements, and especially his deep interest in the I Ching, are parallel to those of American composer John Cage.

== References in literature ==
Since the 1920s Hauer has figured in literature, e.g., in Otto Stoessl's novel Sonnenmelodie (1923) and Franz Werfel's Verdi. Roman der Oper (1924 - the character Matthias Fischboeck). Late in life Hauer spoke about Thomas Mann, as well as Theodor W. Adorno, with great bitterness, for he felt that both men had misunderstood him. Adorno had written about Hauer, but only disparagingly. Because of his later achievements and developments it has also been assumed by many scholars that Hauer is also a model for the "Joculator Basiliensis" in Hermann Hesse's The Glass Bead Game.

== Musical works ==
576 works are known (Lafite index), amongst which are:

- Apokalyptische Fantasie, Op. 5 (1913)
- Nachklangstudien (Resonances), Op. 16 (1919)
- Nomos, Op. 19 (1919)
- Atonale Musik, Op. 20 (1922)
- Cantata Wandlungen, Op. 53 (1927) – Premiere conducted by Hermann Scherchen
- Violinkonzert mit Orchester in einem Satz, Op. 54 (1928) – Premiere conducted by Hermann Scherchen
- Klavierkonzert mit Orchester in einem Satz, Op. 55 (1928)
- Opera Salambo, Op. 60 (1929), after Flaubert's Salammbô – Premiere conducted by Otto Klemperer
- Opera Die schwarze Spinne, Op. 62 (1932), after Jeremias Gotthelf's The Black Spider– Premiere conducted by Michael Gielen
- Various Hölderlin cantatas
- Cantata Der Menschen Weg, Op. 67 (1934), text: Hölderlin
- Fantasie für Klavier (Fantasy for piano), Op. 39 (1925)
- Emilie vor ihrem Brauttag Op. 58 (1928) (Hölderlin poem)
- Charakterstücke für Salonorchester
- Zwölftonmusik für neun Soloinstrumente, Op. 73 (twelve-tone music for nine solo instruments) (1937)
- Frühling, Op. 76 (1938) for mixed choir, violins, cellos (Hölderlin poem)
- Zwölftonmusik für Orchester (twelve-tone music for orchestra) (1939)
- Zwölftonmusik für Orchester mit einer Zwölftonreihe, die in sechs verschiedenen Tropen steht (twelve-tone music for orchestra with a twelve-tone row, in six different tropes) (1945)
- Zwölftonspiel für fünf Violinen (twelve-tone piece for five violins) (1949), dedicated to Hermann Heiß
- Zwölftonspiel für Klavier zu vier Händen (twelve-tone piece for piano four hands) (1956)
- Zwölftonspiel für Flöte, Fagott und Streichquartett (1.1958)

== Theoretical writings ==
Hauer is considered an important figure in the development of twelve-tone theory and aesthetics. His early published writings Vom Wesen des Musikalischen (1920) and Deutung des Melos articulate the more theoretical and aesthetic aspects of Hauer's thought, while Vom Melos zur Pauke (1925) and Zwölftontechnik, Die Lehre von den Tropen (1926) provide detailed musical examples. Because of the discussion of tropes in Zwölftontechnik, Hauer has usually been cast as an advocate for trope composition in contrast to those advocating the use of an ordered twelve-tone series. This view, however, is mistaken; tropes were only one of the many ways Hauer had of approaching a systematic circulation of all twelve tones. (Much of the music praised by those who advocated for an ordered series—the music of Schoenberg and Berg especially—was much more flexible in actual practice than the descriptions of them seems to indicate.) These early theoretical works make Hauer one of the founders of twelve-tone theory.

In his theoretical writing, Hauer often casts the twelve tempered tones as a kind of spiritual world. For Hauer, this twelve-tone world offers one access to the fundamental truths of existence, transforming composition from an act of personal expression into one of devotion and contemplation. His various twelve-tone techniques thus become a means to an end, as do the pieces themselves; the ultimate goal of music is to commune with the infinite. This mystical approach to music is drawn from 19th-century romanticism and is certainly not exclusive to Hauer, though he may have been the most publicly vocal proponent of this idea in the Vienna of his day. In fact, much of the thinking of the Second Viennese School is bound up with the idea that music provides access to spiritual truth, an idea adapted from the writing of Schopenhauer, who enjoyed considerable popularity at this time, especially among artists. Hauer often refers to the scientific writing of Goethe (the Theory of Colors especially), which most likely came to him through the editions and commentary of Rudolf Steiner.

The most important writings:

- 17 theoretical writings (1918–1926), 33 essays and articles (1919–1948)
- Über die Klangfarbe ("About Tone-Color", 1918)
- Vom Wesen des Musikalischen ("On the Essence of Music", 1920)
- Deutung des Melos ("Interpretation of the Melos", 1923)
- "Atonale Melodienlehre" ("Teachings on Atonal Melodies", manuscript, 1923)
- Vom Melos zur Pauke ("From the Melos to the Kettledrum", 1925)
- Zwölftontechnik. Die Lehre von den Tropen ("Twelve-Tone Technique: Teachings on the Tropes", 1926)
- "Der Goldene Schnitt. Eine Rechtfertigung der Zwölftonmusik" ("The Golden Ratio", manuscript, 1926)
- "Kosmisches Testament" (three "Cosmic Testaments", manuscripts, 1937, 1941, 1945)

== See also ==
- List of Austrians in music

== Sources ==
- Covach, John Rudolph (1990). The music and theories of Josef Matthias Hauer (Ph.D. thesis). University of Michigan. ISBN 979-8-207-44053-8. ProQuest 303842342 (DAI-A 52/03, Dissertation Abstracts International; UMI Order Number 9116157).
- Covach, John R. (Spring 1992). "The Zwölftonspiel of Josef Matthias Hauer". Journal of Music Theory. 36 (1): 149–184. doi:10.2307/843913. ISSN 0022-2909. JSTOR 843913.
- Covach, John (2002). "Twelve-tone theory". In Christensen, Thomas (ed.). The Cambridge History of Western Music Theory. The Cambridge History of Music. Cambridge University Press. pp. 603–627. doi:10.1017/CHOL9780521623711.021. ISBN 9781139053471 (digital), 978-0-521-68698-3 (paperback).
- Covach, John. 2003. "Josef Matthias Hauer". In Music of the Twentieth Century Avant-Garde, edited by Larry Sitsky, 197–202. [N.p.]: Greenwood Publishing.
- Lichtenfeld, Monika (2001). "Hauer, Josef Matthias". In Sadie, Stanley; Tyrrell, John (eds.). The New Grove Dictionary of Music and Musicians. Vol. 11 (2nd ed.). London: Macmillan Publishers; New York: Grove's Dictionaries. pp. 134–137. ISBN 978-1-56159-239-5. Internet Archive newgrovedictiona0011unse.
- Whittall, Arnold. 2008. The Cambridge Introduction to Serialism. Cambridge Introductions to Music. Cambridge & New York: Cambridge University Press. ISBN 978-0-521-86341-4 (cloth) ISBN 978-0-521-68200-8 (pbk.)
