= Medea (ballet) =

Ballet by Samuel Barber

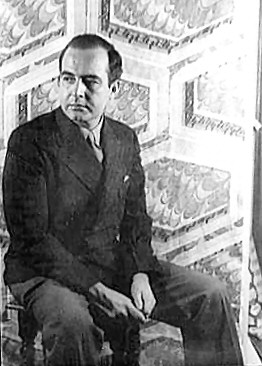
Samuel Barber in 1944

Medea, Op. 23, (1946) is a ballet suite by American composer Samuel Barber. It was commissioned by the Ditson Fund of Columbia University for Martha Graham and was premiered on 10 May 1946, at Columbia University's McMillin Theater, New York City. The ballet was originally called Serpent Heart, but the work was revised in 1947 and retitled Cave of the Heart. Costumes were designed by Edythe Gilfond and the set was created by Isamu Noguchi. The original cast list included Graham, Erick Hawkins, Yuriko, May O'Donnell, and other members of the Martha Graham Dance Company.

Although loosely based on Euripides' play Medea, neither Barber nor Graham desired to use the legend literally in the ballet. Instead, these mythical figures served rather to project psychological states of jealousy and vengeance which are timeless. The choreography and music were conceived, as it were, on two time levels, the ancient mythical and the contemporary. Medea and Jason first appear as godlike, super-human figures of the Greek tragedy. As the tension and conflict between them increases, they step out of their legendary roles from time to time and become the modern man and woman, caught in the nets of jealousy and destructive love; and at the end resume their mythical quality. In both the dancing and music, archaic and contemporary idioms are used. Medea, in her final scene after the denouement, becomes once more the descendant of the sun.

Beside Medea and Jason there are two other characters in the ballet, the Young Princess whom Jason marries out of ambition and for whom he betrays Medea, and an attendant who assumes the part of the onlooking chorus of the Greek tragedy, sympathizing, consoling and interpreting the actions of the major characters.

== Medea Suite for Orchestra, Op. 23 (1947) ==
Early in 1947, Barber extracted from the ballet a seven-movement suite for full orchestra. Graham used the titles Serpent Heart and Cave of the Heart for her ballet, but the composer preferred to use the original source of the idea, the Medea-Jason legend, as the title for his suite.

The Suite has seven movements:

1. Parodos
2. Choros. Medea and Jason
3. The Young Princess. Jason
4. Choros
5. Medea
6. Kantikos Agonias
7. Exodos

The Suite was first performed by the Philadelphia Orchestra under Eugene Ormandy on 5 December 1947.

Barber's Medea's Dance of Vengeance Op. 23a (1955) was derived from the work.

== Note and References ==
- Heyman, Barbara B. (1999). Samuel Barber: The Composer and His Music. Oxford University Press. ISBN 978-0195090581
