= Victoria Records (1951) =

American record label

- Founded: 1951
- Founder: Al Alberts
- Country of origin: United States

Victoria Records was started in 1951 by Al Alberts of The Four Aces in Philadelphia, Pennsylvania to release their recording of "(It's No) Sin." This record charted nationally at No. 4 in September 1951.

== See also ==
- List of record labels
- Victoria Records
