= I'm Yours (1952 song) =

"I'm Yours" is a 1952 popular song by Robert Mellin. Recordings of it were made by Eddie Fisher (the biggest hit version), Don Cornell, The Four Aces, and Toni Arden.

The recording by Eddie Fisher was released by RCA Victor Records as catalog number 20-4680, with the flip side "Just a Little Lovin'". It first reached the Billboard magazine Best Seller chart on April 25, 1952, and lasted 19 weeks on the chart, peaking at number 5.

The recording by Don Cornell with Norman Leyden's Orchestra was released by Coral Records as catalog number 60690, with the flip side "My Mother's Pearls". It first reached the Billboard Best Seller chart on April 18, 1952, and lasted 16 weeks on the chart, peaking at number 5.

The recording by The Four Aces was recorded on April 14, 1952, and released by Decca Records as catalog number 28162, with the flip side "I Understand". It first reached the Billboard Best Seller chart on May 23, 1952, and lasted three weeks on the chart, peaking at number 21.

The recording by Toni Arden was recorded with Percy Faith's orchestra in 1952 and released by Columbia Records as catalog number 39737, with the flip side "Kiss of Fire".
