= Love Is a Many-Splendored Thing (song) =

1955 Academy Award winning song

Sheet music cover from 1955, with poster artwork from film of the same name featuring its two stars.

"Love Is a Many-Splendored Thing" is a popular song with music by Sammy Fain and lyrics by Paul Francis Webster. The song appeared first in the movie Love Is a Many-Splendored Thing (1955), and it won the Academy Award for Best Original Song in 1956. From 1967 to 1973, it was also used as the theme song to Love is a Many Splendored Thing, the soap opera based on the movie.

Many versions of the song have been released. The best-selling version was recorded by The Four Aces, whose recording reached number two in the UK Singles Chart, and number one on both the Billboard and Cash Box charts in 1955.

== Background ==
The music was commissioned by 20th Century Fox for the movie Love Is a Many-Splendored Thing. The film producer Buddy Adler asked composer Sammy Fain and lyricist Paul Francis Webster to write a title song for the film. The film was adapted from the book A Many-Splendoured Thing, so the songwriters wrote the song based on that title. However, it was then decided that the title of the film would be better if preceded by the words "Love Is", and Fain and Webster wrote a second song using that title. This second song with a new set of lyrics was then used as the title song, while the first song was discarded.

The song has been noted for its similarity to the aria "Un bel dì vedremo" from Giacomo Puccini’s opera, Madama Butterfly in its downward moving thirds. This song is also noted for its memorable lines: "In the morning mist, two lovers kissed, and the world stood still".

The song was initially used only as background music in the film, but the film was recalled and the words sung to make the song eligible for the Best Original Song category of the Academy Awards. An orchestral version of "Love Is a Many-Splendored Thing" accompanies the title sequence of the film, while a vocal version performed by a chorus is played at the end. Before the film was released, Don Cornell and the Four Aces recorded the song which they released as singles. Many major artists, including Nat King Cole, Eddie Fisher and Doris Day, were first contacted to record the song, but they disliked it and refused to record it. However, they recorded the song after the version by the Four Aces became a hit.

Sammy Fain and Paul Francis Webster won an Oscar for Best Original Song at the 28th Academy Awards, their second Oscar after winning the award for "Secret Love" in 1953. The background score for the film, composed and conducted by Alfred Newman, was built in parts around the melody of the song, and it also won an Oscar for Best Original Score for Newman.

== Four Aces version ==
"Love Is a Many-Splendored Thing"
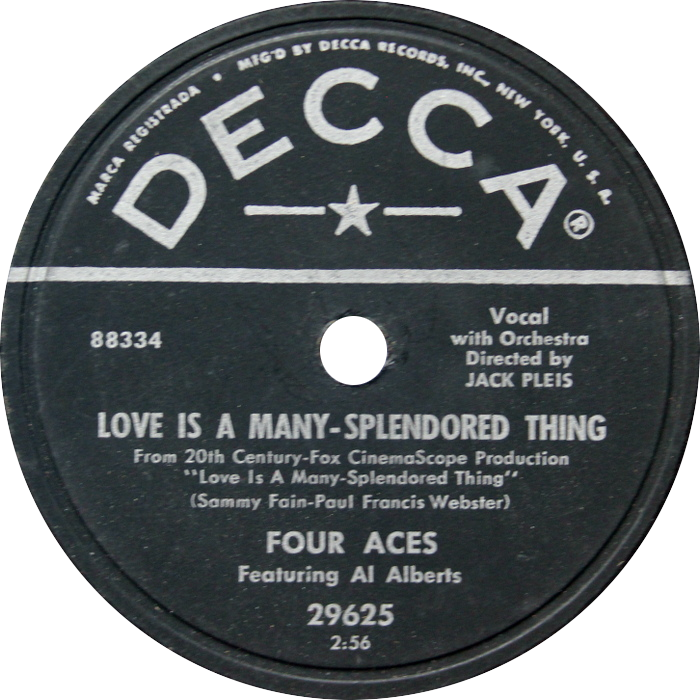

Single by The Four Aces

from the album Hits From Hollywood
- B-side: "Shine On, Harvest Moon"
- Released: July 22, 1955
- Recorded: 1955
- Genre: Traditional pop
- Length: 2:56
- Label: Decca
- Songwriters: Sammy Fain, Paul Francis Webster

The Four Aces singles chronology
"Sluefoot" (1955)	"Love Is a Many-Splendored Thing" (1955)	"A Woman in Love" (1955)

The song was covered by The Four Aces featuring Al Roberts backed by the Jack Pleis Orchestra and issued by Decca Records as catalog number 29625. The film studio 20th Century Fox was said to have subsidized an album of The Four Aces so that they could release it as a single to help promote the film. The song was released backed with "Shine On, Harvest Moon" in July 1955, and first reached No. 1 on the Best Sellers chart in October 1955. It also became the first number one on Billboard's new Top 100 chart, released in November 1955. It was ranked No. 8 on Billboard's 1955's Top Tune year-end chart.

The recording by The Four Aces is featured in the film Cookie (1989). It became a gold record.

=== Charts ===
Chart (1955)	Peak position
Australia (AMR)	3
Belgium (Ultratop 50 Flanders)	6
UK Singles (Official Charts)	2
US The Top 100 (Billboard)	1
US Cash Box	1

== Other versions ==
Don Cornell recorded a version around at the same time as the Four Aces. It was issued by Coral Records (catalog number 61467) backed with "The Bible Tells Me So". The song reached No. 26 on Billboard's Top 100 chart. A number of orchestral versions were also released in the same year and reached the Top 100 chart; David Rose and His Orchestra reached No 54, while Woody Herman and His Orchestra reached No. 79.

Bing Crosby recorded the song in 1955 for use on his radio show and it was subsequently included in the box set The Bing Crosby CBS Radio Recordings (1954–56) issued by Mosaic Records (catalog MD7-245) in 2009. The song has also been recorded by Ray Conniff (on his 1958 album Hollywood In Rhythm) Ringo Starr (on his album Sentimental Journey), Frank Sinatra, Andy Williams, Shirley Bassey (1962), Nat King Cole and Barry Manilow. Neil Sedaka recorded the song in Italian as "L'Amore E' Una Cosa Meravigliosa".

Connie Francis recorded the song in Italian in 1960 during the work for her album More Italian Favorites, although this version remains unreleased to this day. Francis also recorded the original English lyrics in 1961 for her album Connie Francis Sings 'Never on Sunday' and Other Title Songs from Motion Pictures. The instrumental playback of this 1961 recording was also used when Francis cut a German-language version, "Sag, weißt du denn, was Liebe ist", in 1966.

The song was also performed by Fairuz in Arabic ("Zar Bisukun Al Lail"). French-Malaysian singer Shake recorded a French version of the song in 1977 titled "Rien n'est plus beau que l'amour". A disco version was recorded by Tina Charles in 1980. It was also covered by the Bina Vokalia Children's Choir under the direction of Pranadjaja on Dendang Buah Hati concert in 1996. Jeff Lynne recorded his version for his nostalgic cover album Long Wave in 2012.

Barry Manilow recorded a version which reached No. 32 on the Adult Contemporary chart in 2006.

This song has been a staple of Engelbert Humperdinck's live show since 1995.

Farley (2026).

== In popular culture ==
The song is played in the opening scene of Grease. Other films that used the song include Circle of Friends, Private Parts, St. Trinian's, St. Trinian's 2: The Legend of Fritton's Gold, and The Nutty Professor 2. The song, among others, was referenced in Moulin Rouge! when Christian says, "Love is like oxygen - love is a many splendored thing - love lifts us up where we belong! All you need is love!"

In an episode of the American sitcom Family Ties, an overjoyed Alex sings the song as he comes home after falling for a girl at his college. His father, Steve, joins in.

It has been also heard in the series Bones, in the 14th episode of the third season sung by Dr. Zack Addy (Eric Millegan).

On the 30 May 1987 edition of American Top 40, Casey Kasem claimed that "Love Is A Many-Splendored Thing" and Chic's "Le Freak" were the only two #1 chart entries, at the time, which had returned to #1 for a second and a third time. "Le Freak" did, but "Love Is A Many-Splendored Thing" only returned for a second time, and then only on the Best Sellers in Stores chart.

== See also ==
- List of number-one singles of 1955 (U.S.)
