= The Bible Tells Me So =

1955 gospel pop song

Single by Nick Noble
- B-side: "Army of the Lord"
- Released: August 1955
- Genre: Gospel, Pop
- Label: Wing Records
- Songwriter: Dale Evans

Nick Noble singles chronology
"The Bible Tells Me So" (1955)	"To You, My Love" (1956)

"The Bible Tells Me So"

Single by Don Cornell
- B-side: "Love Is a Many-Splendored Thing"
- Released: September 1955
- Genre: Gospel, Pop
- Label: Coral Records
- Songwriter: Dale Evans

Don Cornell singles chronology
"Stranger in Paradise" (1955)	"The Bible Tells Me So" (1955)	"Young Abe Lincoln" (1955)

"The Bible Tells Me So" is a 1955 gospel pop hit written by Dale Evans. Nick Noble's version was the first of two to chart. It features the Lew Douglas orchestra and backing vocals by the Jack Halloran Choir.

== Don Cornell cover ==
Don Cornell's version followed Noble's rendition on the charts by one month. It reached number seven during the fall of 1955 and is the most successful version of the song.

The B-side of Cornell's record, "Love Is a Many-Splendored Thing," also reached the U.S. Top 40, peaking at number 26. It was the theme song of the movie of the same name. His version was the second of five charting versions of the song during 1955.

== Lyrical content ==
"The Bible Tells Me So" speaks of trust in and reliance on God as revealed in the Bible, as the source of faith, hope and charity. The Bible is extolled in the song as the best way to live, as being not only the key to success, but also the way to please God and receive His guidance.

== Other cover versions ==
Dale Evans, the writer of the song, recorded her own version on her 1960 LP, Jesus Loves Me featuring Roy Rogers, Dale Evans and family. She often sang the song as a duet with her husband. Others who have covered "The Bible Tells Me So" include Mahalia Jackson, Martha Carson and Kate Smith.

== Chart history ==
=== Weekly charts ===
The song reached No. 8 on the U.S. Cash Box Top 50 Best Selling Records chart, in a tandem ranking of Don Cornell, Nick Noble, Kay Armen, and Roy Rogers & Dale Evans's versions, with Don Cornell and Nick Noble's versions marked as bestsellers. The song also reached No. 7 on Billboard's Honor Roll of Hits, with Don Cornell and Nick Noble's versions listed as best sellers.

In Australia, the song charted regionally. It entered the Brisbane charts in January 1956, and reached number 3. In Sydney, it charted twice: in January, when it reached number 10 (in a 10-song Hit Parade), and again in March 1956 when it went to number 4.

==== Nick Noble version ====
Chart (1955)	Peak position
US Billboard Best Sellers in Stores	22

==== Don Cornell version ====
Chart (1955)	Peak position
US Billboard Best Sellers in Stores	7
US Billboard Most Played in Juke Boxes	8
US Billboard Most Played by Jockeys	18

=== Year-end charts ===
Chart (1955)	Rank
US Billboard 1955's Top Tunes	31

== In popular culture ==
- In the second verse of his 1971 song "American Pie," Don McLean mentions the title of this song, as "if the Bible tells you so", among many other 1950s musical and pop culture references.
