= Ilia Trilling =

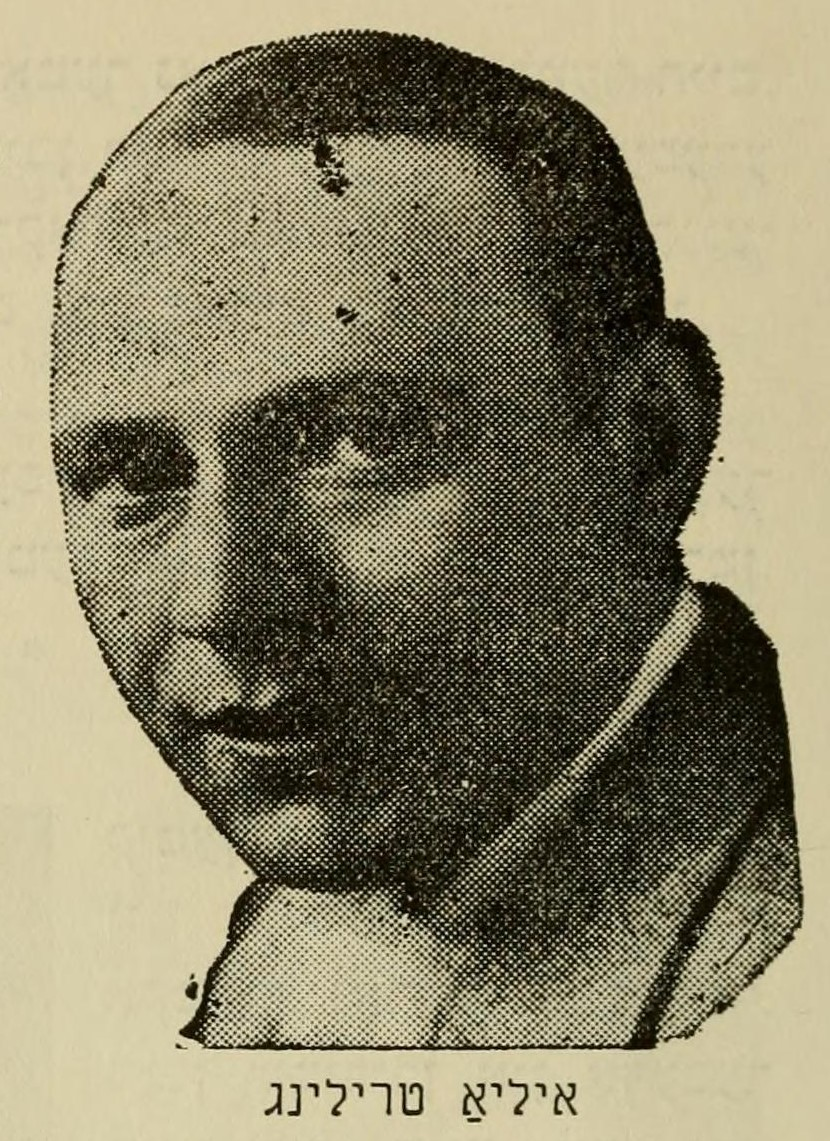
Ilia Trilling, Yiddish theatre producer and composer

Ilia Trilling (or Ilya Trilling) (Yiddish: איליאַ טרילינג, 1895–1947) was a German-born Yiddish Theatre producer, actor, and composer as well as a dance teacher. He was active in Poland, Ukraine and the United States.

Trilling was born in Elberfeld (now Wuppertal).

== Works ==
- Zog, Zog, Zog Es Mir (Tell Me, Say It to Me)
- Du Shaynst Vi Di Zun (You Shine Like the Sun)
