= Norman Lee (musician) =

American jazz musician

- Born: Norman Uehle; March 21, 1921; Danbury, Iowa, U.S.
- Died: December 6, 1978 (aged 57) Wichita, Kansas, U.S.
- Genres: Jazz
- Instruments: Clarinet, vocals

Norman Lee (March 21, 1921 – December 6, 1978) was an American songwriter, jazz clarinetist, and big band singer of the 1950s to 1970s.

== Early life ==
Born Norman Uehle in Danbury, Iowa, Lee was raised in nearby Correctionville, Iowa. His mother, Alice Lee, was also a musician.

== Career ==
Lee is best known for his collaboration with Lawrence Welk. Lee co-authored several songs, including "Champagne Polka", with Welk. Lee also led his own group, the Norman Lee Orchestra, in Kansas. Lee also toured the United States with the Eddy Howard Orchestra and later took over the group after Howard's death.

== Death ==
In 1978, Lee was murdered by a former member of his band along with his wife and publicist in Wichita, Kansas.

== Discography ==
- "Slappin' Clarinet"
- "Let's Go Dance Again"
