= Nick Noble (singer) =

American singer (1926–2012)

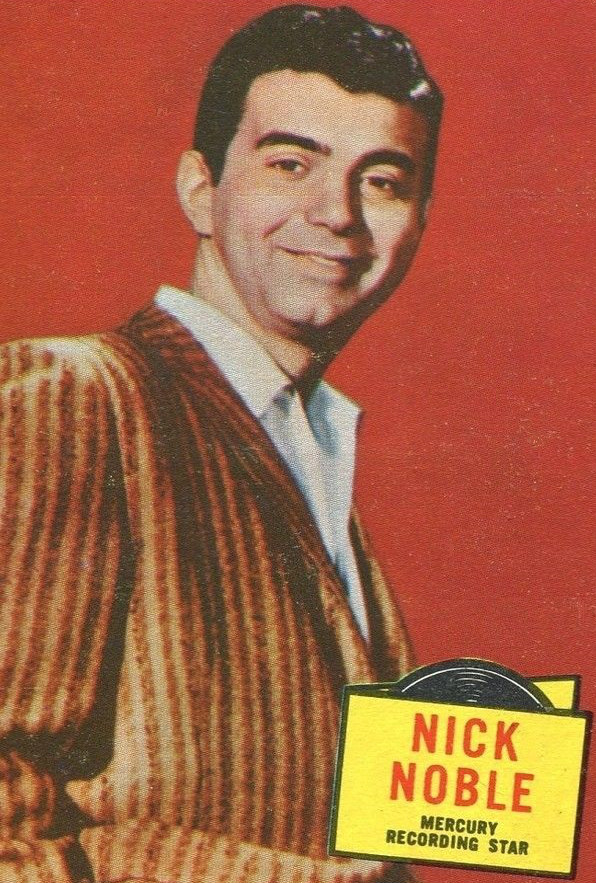

Nick Noble (born Nicholas Valkan; June 21, 1926 – March 24, 2012) was an American pop singer, who was best known for his recordings of "The Tip of My Fingers" and "Moonlight Swim".

Born in Chicago, Illinois, Noble was a graduate of Hirsch Metropolitan High School and Loyola University and a navy veteran in the later days of World War II.

Noble was popular in the mid-1950s, and he scored four hits on the newly created Billboard pop charts between 1955 and 1957. His singles remained popular in Chicago and nationwide in the early 1960s, with his 1962 cover of Carl Belew's "Hello Out There" reaching the WLS Top 15. He regained national chart status in 1978 with the country and easy listening hit "Stay With Me". He also recorded for Coral, and Columbia and during his career recorded 109 singles and four albums.

In later years, he was associated with and later owned the very successful and nationally known restaurant Lou Mitchell's, in downtown Chicago.

Noble died on March 24, 2012, aged 85.

== Chart singles ==
- "The Bible Tells Me So" (Wing Records, 1955) U.S. No. 22. Orchestrated by Lew Douglas. Backing vocals by Jack Halloran Choir.
- "To You My Love" (Mercury Records, 1956) U.S. No. 27. Orchestrated by Carl Stevens. Backing vocals by Jack Halloran Choir.
- "A Fallen Star" (Mercury, 1957) U.S. No. 20. Orchestrated by Carl Stevens. Backing vocals by Dick Noel singers.
- "Moonlight Swim" (Mercury, 1957) U.S. No. 37. Orchestrated by Carl Stevens.
- "Girl With the Long Red Hair" (20th Century, 1965) WLS No. 36. Written by Norman Welch and Eddie Mascari
- "Stay With Me" (Churchill Records, 1978) U.S. Adult Contemporary No. 38. No. 40 U.S. Hot Country Singles.

== Other source ==
- Joel Whitburn, The Billboard Book of Top 40 Hits. 7th edn, 2000
