= Don Cornell =

American singer (1919–2004)

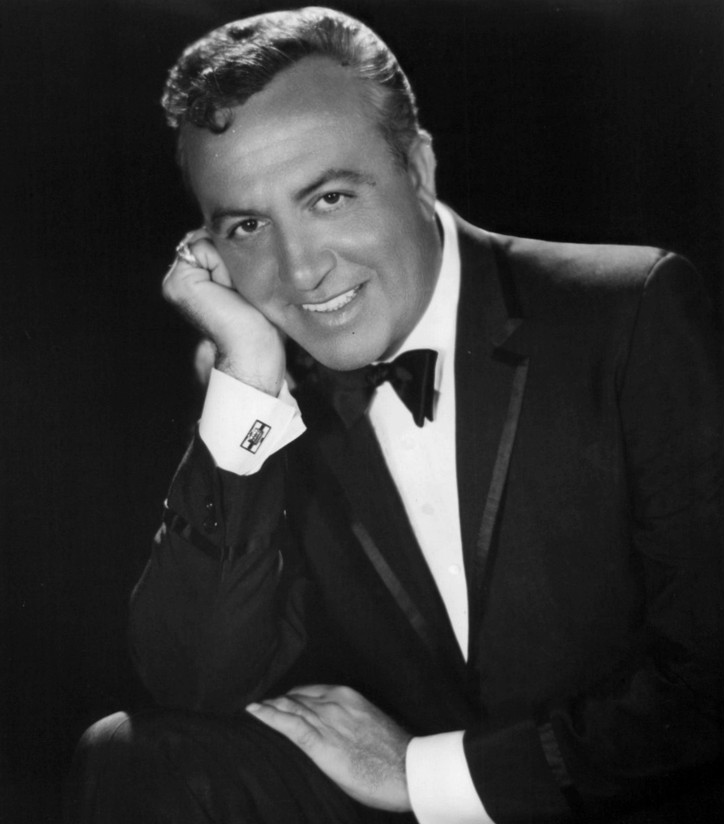
- Cornell in 1963

Background information
- Born: Luigi Francisco Varlaro; April 21, 1919; New York City, U.S.
- Died: February 23, 2004 (aged 84) Aventura, Florida, U.S.
- Genres: Jazz; big band; traditional pop
- Occupation: Singer
- Years active: 1940s–1990s
- Labels: RCA Victor, Jubilee Records

Don Cornell (born Luigi Francisco Varlaro; April 21, 1919 – February 23, 2004) was an American jazz, big band and traditional pop singer and guitarist.

== Early years ==
Cornell was born in The Bronx, New York, to an Italian family, Cornell attended Roosevelt High School in the Bronx.

== Career ==
In his teens he played guitar in a band led by jazz trumpeter Red Nichols. When he was eighteen, he was a vocalist in the Sammy Kaye band. He became a solo act in 1949. Between 1950 and 1962, twelve of his records were certified gold. These included the million-seller "It Isn't Fair", plus "I'll Walk Alone", "I'm Yours", and "Hold My Hand". He appeared often on television programs hosted by Perry Como, Jackie Gleason, and Arthur Godfrey during the 1950s and 1960s.

When singing at the Beverly Hills Supper Club in Kentucky, he appeared many times on the Ruth Lyons television program and was a substitute host. In 1953, he was on the TV program Chance of a Lifetime. He had a radio program on KGO in San Francisco in 1953.

In 1959, Cornell, comedian Martha Raye, and other investors formed The Big Daddy Mining Company. The company planned to mine "a rich gold vein on a hillside near Coarsegold, California".

Cornell worked as a singer into the 1990s. He and his wife founded the label Iris as a division of MCA to release songs he recorded for Coral and Dot earlier in his career. These albums include Something to Remember Me By and From Italy with Love.

== Awards and honors ==
Cornell was named to the Hollywood Walk of Fame in 1963. In 1993, he was inducted into the Big Band Hall of Fame.

His 1952 hit "I" was the only single-character pop chart entry until Prince's No. 7 Billboard Hot 100 hit "7" from 1992 and the only single-letter hit until Xzibit's No. 76 Hot 100 hit "X" from 2000. "Hold My Hand" sold over one million copies and topped the UK Singles Chart in 1954. Cornell's 1955 hit "Young Abe Lincoln" previously held the record for highest debuting pop single (No. 25) to spend only one week on the Billboard chart.

== Death ==
Cornell died in Aventura, Florida, from emphysema and diabetes at the age of 84.

== Hit records ==
Year	Single	Chart positions		
Year	Single	US BB	US CB	UK
1942	"I Left My Heart at the Stagedoor Canteen"(with Sammy Kaye)	3		
1942	"I Came Here to Talk for Joe"(with Sammy Kaye)	8		
1947	"That's My Desire"(with Sammy Kaye)	2		
1947	"The Red Silk Stockings and Green Perfume"(with Sammy Kaye)	8		
1947	"The Little Old Mill"(with Sammy Kaye)	24		
1947	"Serenade of the Bells"(with Sammy Kaye)	3		
1947	"Hand In Hand"(with Sammy Kaye & Laura Leslie)	21		
1947	"I'll Hate Myself In the Morning"(with Sammy Kaye & Laura Leslie)	20		
1948	"I Love You, Yes I Do"(with Sammy Kaye)	10		
1948	"Tell Me a Story"(with Sammy Kaye)	8		
1948	"Down Among the Sheltering Palms"(with Sammy Kaye)	14		
1949	"Careless Hands"(with Sammy Kaye)	3		
1949	"Kiss Me Sweet"(with Sammy Kaye & Laura Leslie)	29		
1949	"Room Full of Roses"(with Sammy Kaye)	2		
1949	"Baby, It's Cold Outside"(with Sammy Kaye & Laura Leslie)	12		
1949	"It Isn't Fair"(with Sammy Kaye)	2		
1950	"I Need You So"	28		
1952	"I'll Walk Alone"	5		
1952	"I'm Yours"	3		
1952	"This Is the Beginning of the End"	20		
1952	"You'll Never Get Away"(with Teresa Brewer)	17	17	
1952	"I"	7	10	
1952	"Be Fair"		20	
1953	"S'posin'"	28		
1953	"She Loves Me"	23	33	
1953	"Please Play Our Song"	18		
1953	"Heart of My Heart"(with Alan Dale & Johnny Desmond)	10	5	
1953	"You're On Trial"	24		
1954	"Size 12"	23		
1954	"Hold Me"		26	
1954	"Believe In Me"	22		
1954	"Hold My Hand"	2	6	1
1954	"No Man Is an Island"		21	
1955	"Give Me Your Love"		28	
1955	"Most of All"	14	16	
1955	"The Door Is Still Open to My Heart"	flip	22	
1955	"Stranger In Paradise"			19
1955	"The Bible Tells Me So"	7	7	
1955	"Love Is a Many-Splendored Thing"	26		
1955	"Young Abe Lincoln"	25	45	
1956	"Teenage Meeting"	80		
1956	"Rock Island Line"	59		
1956	"See Saw"	57		
1957	"My Faith, My Hope, My Love"		57	
1957	"Mama Guitar"	47	57	
1958	"Play Some Music For Broken Hearts"		95	
