= Victoria Records (2015) =

Mexican record label, management company, and publisher

Victoria Records is a Mexican record label, management company, publisher and recording studio, located in Monterrey, Nuevo León, Mexico. Artists like Korn, The Strokes, Jonas Cuaron, Pedro Fernandez, The Warning and Intocable are some of their clients.

== History ==
In 2000, the Morales Kuhne family built a private studio in Monterrey, Nuevo León, Mexico called Southern Signal. It worked at that time only as an artist developer for EMI music.

In 2011, singer and songwriter Victoria Morales Kuhne took over the studio, to open it to the public for the first time. After that, Victoria changed its name to La Mansion-Victoria Records.

In January 2015, Victoria Records launched the record label Victoria Records, the publisher Victoria Publishing and the management company located at Mexico and the US. In the same year, Victoria changed the name of everything to Victoria Records.

In June 2016, CEO of Victoria Records Victoria Morales Kuhne and CEO of Canicula Entretenimiento Sergio Tijerina, signed an association to develop new and already consolidated artists. In the same year, the studio was nominated for TEC Award for best recording studio.

== Victoria Records Studio ==
Victoria Records studio is housed in a former 1940s mansion situated on a hilltop of Monterrey Obispado suburbs. The acoustic design and system integration was commissioned by Horacio Malvicino Design Group.

It has 3 control rooms, 2 live rooms, 4 isolation booths, a reverb chamber a rehearsal room and a composition rooms. It also features 4 deluxe hotel-style rooms, a kitchen with private chef, a dining room, private guards, housekeeping service, private offices for their clients, an entertainment area with home theater, a bar and the hole facility is surrounded by lush gardens in a secure compound.

== Gear ==
=== Studio A Live Room ===
The Studio A live room is a completely floated room designed to reduce the transfer of vibrations. It has rotary panels that cover the walls of the room, which vary the acoustics with diffusion, absorption and reflectors that are controlled in the control room. It also has a motorized stage with Public Address system designed for live shows. The room has the versatility to record a symphonic orchestra, a single voice or to mount a 300 public live show thanks to the multiple analogue console Midas XL 200.

=== Studio A Control Room ===
The studio A control room has a Solid State Logic Duality SE mixing desk with 48 inputs ran into Pro Tools HDX 10/11.

=== Studio B Control Room ===
The studio B control room has a Sony OXF-R3 with 40 inputs, only 4 of these mixing desks are in Latin America and all of them are in Victoria records.

=== Studio C Control Room ===
The studio C control room has a Sony OXF-R3 with 32 inputs.

25°40′31.43″N 100°20′55.72″W
