= Billboard Hot 100 =

American song chart

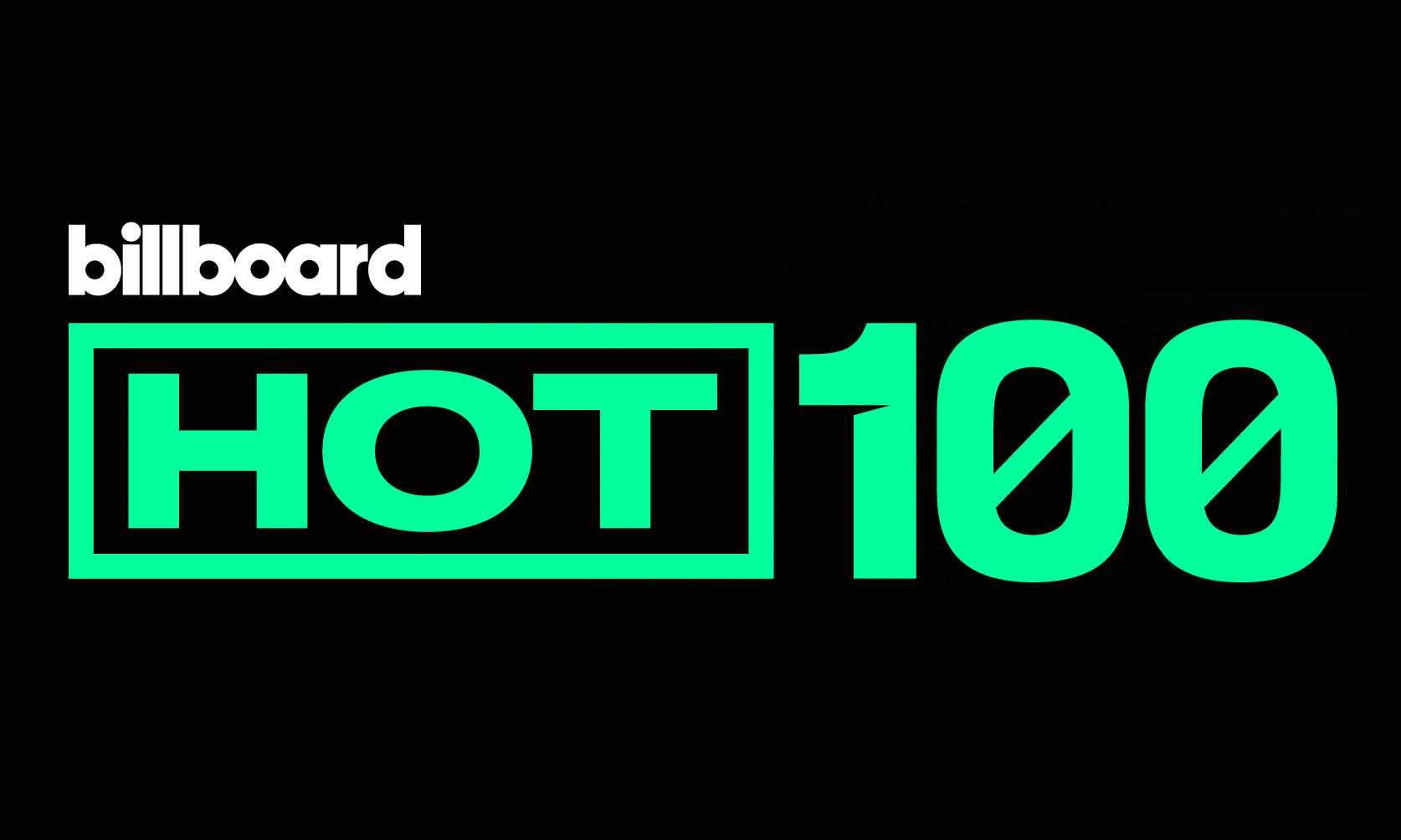
The current Billboard Hot 100 logo

The Billboard Hot 100, also known as simply the Hot 100, is the music industry standard record chart in the United States for songs, published weekly by Billboard magazine. Chart rankings are based on sales (physical and digital), online streaming, and radio airplay in the U.S.

A new chart is compiled and released online to the public by Billboard's website on Tuesdays but post-dated to the following Saturday, when the printed magazine first reaches newsstands. Since July 2015, the weekly tracking period for sales has been Friday–Thursday. It was initially Monday–Sunday when Nielsen started tracking sales in 1991. This tracking period also applies to the compilation of online streaming data. Radio airplay is readily available in real time, unlike sales figures and streaming, but is also tracked on the same Friday–Thursday cycle, effective with the chart dated July 17, 2021. Previously, radio was tracked Monday–Sunday and, before July 2015, Wednesday–Tuesday.

The first number-one song of the Billboard Hot 100 was "Poor Little Fool" by Ricky Nelson, on August 4, 1958. As of the issue for the week ending on November 21, 2026, the Billboard Hot 100 has had 1,195 different number-one entries. The current number-one song on the chart is "Choosin' Texas" by Ella Langley.

== History ==

Previous iterations of the logo

The first chart published by Billboard was "Last Week's Ten Best Sellers Among the Popular Songs", a list of best-selling sheet music, in July 1913. Other charts listed popular song performances in theatres and recitals. In 1928, "Popular Numbers Featured by Famous Singers and Leaders" appeared, which added radio performances to in-person performances. On January 4, 1936, Billboard magazine published "Ten Best Records for Week Ending", which listed the 10 top-selling records of three leading record companies, as reported by the companies themselves. In October 1938, a review list, "The Week's Best Records", was retitled "The Billboard Record Buying Guide" by incorporating airplay and sheet music sales, which would eventually become the first trade survey of record popularity. This led to the full-page "Billboard Music Popularity Chart" for the week ending July 20, 1940, and published in the July 27 issue, with lists covering jukebox play, retail sales, sheet music sales, and radio play. Listed were 10 songs of the national "Best Selling Retail Records", which was the fore-runner of today's pop chart, with "I'll Never Smile Again" by Tommy Dorsey its first number one.

Starting on March 24, 1945, Billboard's lead popularity chart was the Honor Roll of Hits. This chart ranked the most popular songs regardless of performer (it combined different versions of the same song by different artists) based on record and sheet sales, disk jockey, and jukebox performances as determined by Billboard's weekly nationwide survey. At the start of the rock era in 1955, there were three charts that measured songs by individual metrics:

- Best Sellers in Stores was the best-seller chart first established in July 1940. This chart ranked the top-selling singles in retail stores, as reported by merchants surveyed nationwide (20 to 50 positions).
- Most Played by Jockeys was Billboard's original airplay chart. It ranked the most-played songs on United States radio stations, as reported by DJs and stations (20-25 positions).
- Most Played in Jukeboxes ranked the most played songs in jukeboxes across the United States (20 positions). This was one of the main ways of measuring song popularity among younger music listeners, as many radio stations resisted adding rock and roll music to their playlists for many years.

Billboard's primary chart among these was the Best Sellers in Stores chart, and the magazine refers to that when discussing a song's performance before the creation of the Hot 100. In its issue of November 12, 1955, Billboard published The Top 100 for the first time (for the survey weeks ending October 26 and November 2). The Top 100 combined all aspects of a single's performance (sales, airplay and jukebox activity), based on a point system that typically gave sales (purchases) more weight than radio airplay. The first No. 1 in that chart was "Love Is a Many-Splendored Thing" by The Four Aces. The Best Sellers in Stores, Most Played by Jockeys and Most Played in Jukeboxes charts continued to be published concurrently with the new Top 100 chart.

On June 17, 1957, Billboard discontinued the Most Played in Jukeboxes chart as the popularity of jukeboxes waned, and radio stations increasingly incorporated rock-oriented music into their playlists. The week of July 28, 1958, had the final Most Played by Jockeys and Top 100 charts, both of which had Perez Prado's instrumental version of "Patricia" ascending to the top.

On August 4, 1958, Billboard premiered one main all-genre singles chart: the Hot 100, with "Poor Little Fool" by Ricky Nelson its first No. 1. The Hot 100 quickly became the industry standard and Billboard discontinued the Best Sellers In Stores chart on October 13, 1958.

Journalists Tom Noonan, Paul Ackerman, and Seymour Stein created the Hot 100; Stein did not recall who chose the name.

The Billboard Hot 100 is still the standard by which a song's popularity is measured in the United States. The Hot 100 is ranked by radio airplay audience impressions, as measured by Nielsen BDS, sales data compiled by Nielsen SoundScan (both at retail and digitally), and streaming activity from online music sources.

Several component charts contribute to the overall Hot 100 calculation. They are:

- Radio Songs: (per Billboard) approximately 1,000 stations, "composed of adult contemporary, R&B, hip hop, country, rock, gospel, Latin and Christian formats, digitally monitored twenty-four hours a day, seven days a week. Charts are ranked by number of gross audience impressions, computed by cross-referencing exact times of radio airplay with Arbitron listener data."
- Digital Song Sales: Digital sales are tracked by Nielsen SoundScan and are included as part of a title's sales points.
- Streaming Songs: A collaboration between Billboard, Nielsen SoundScan and National Association of Recording Merchandisers that measures the top streamed radio songs, on-demand songs and videos on leading online music services.
- Hot Singles Sales (1984–2017): physical single Nielsen SoundScan tracked sales.

Billboard Hot 100 component charts
Period	Hot Singles Sales (physical single sales)	Radio Songs (song airplay)	Digital Song Sales (song downloads)	Streaming Songs (song streams)
1984–2005	Active	Active	—N/a	—N/a
2005–2013	Active	Active	Active	—N/a
2013–2017	Active	Active	Active	Active
2017–present	Defunct	Active	Active	Active

== Compilation ==
The tracking week for sales, streaming, and airplay begins on Friday. It ends on Thursday (airplay used to have a tracking week from Monday to Sunday, but effective with the chart dated July 17, 2021, the week was adjusted to align with the other two metrics). A new chart is compiled and officially released to the public by Billboard on Tuesday. Each chart is post-dated with the "week-ending" issue date four days after the charts are refreshed online (i.e., the following Saturday). For example:

- Friday, January 1 – tracking week begins for sales, streaming, and airplay
- Thursday, January 7 – tracking week ends for sales, streaming, and airplay
- Tuesday, January 12 – new chart released, with issue post-dated Saturday, January 16

== Policy changes ==
The methods and policies by which this data is obtained and compiled have changed many times throughout the chart's history.

Although the advent of a singles music chart spawned chart historians and chart-watchers and greatly affected pop culture and produced countless bits of trivia, the main purpose of the Hot 100 is to aid those within the music industry: to reflect the popularity of the "product" (the singles, the albums, etc.) and to track the trends of the buying public. Billboard has (many times) changed its methodology and policies to give the most precise and accurate reflection of what is popular. A very basic example of this is the ratio between sales and airplay. During the Hot 100's early history, singles were the primary way people bought music. At times, when single sales were robust, more weight was given to a song's retail points than to its radio airplay.

=== Double-sided singles ===
Billboard has also changed its Hot 100 policy regarding "two-sided singles" several times. The pre-Hot 100 chart "Best Sellers in Stores" listed popular A- and B-sides together, with the side that was played most often (based on its other charts) listed first. One of these was Elvis Presley's "Don't Be Cruel" / "Hound Dog". During the Presley singles' chart run, top billing was switched back and forth between the two sides several times. But on the concurrent "Most Played in Juke Boxes", "Most Played by Jockeys" and the "Top 100", the two songs were listed separately, as was true of all songs. With the initiation of the Hot 100 in 1958, A- and B-sides charted separately, as they had on the former Top 100.

Starting with the Hot 100 chart for the week ending November 29, 1969, this rule was altered; if both sides received significant airplay, they were listed together. This became a moot point by 1972, as most major record labels solidified a trend they had begun in the 1960s by putting the same song on both sides of the singles they sent to radio.

More complex issues began to arise as the typical A- and B-side format of singles gave way to 12-inch singles and maxi-singles, many of which contained more than one B-side. Further problems arose when, in several cases, a B-side would eventually overtake the A-side in popularity, thus prompting record labels to release a new single, featuring the former B-side as the A-side, along with a "new" B-side.

The inclusion of album cuts on the Hot 100 put the double-sided hit issues to rest permanently.

=== Album cuts ===
As many Hot 100 chart policies have been modified over the years, one rule remained constant for over four decades: songs were not eligible to enter the Hot 100 unless they were available to purchase as a single. This was discontinued on December 5, 1998, when the Hot 100 changed from being a "singles" chart to a "songs" chart. During the 1990s, a growing trend in the music industry was to promote songs to radio without ever releasing them as singles. Major record labels claimed that singles were cannibalizing album sales, so they were gradually phased out. During this period, accusations began to fly of chart manipulation as labels would hold off on releasing a single until airplay was at its absolute peak, thus prompting a top ten or, in some cases, a number-one debut. In many cases, a label would delete a single from its catalog after only one week, allowing the song to enter the Hot 100, make a high debut, and then slowly decline in position as the one-time retail single sold out.

It was during this period that several popular mainstream hits never charted on the Hot 100 or charted well after their airplay had declined. During the period that they were not released as singles, the songs were not eligible to chart. Many of these songs dominated the Hot 100 Airplay chart for extended periods of time:

- 1995 The Rembrandts: "I'll Be There for You" (number one for eight weeks)
- 1996 No Doubt: "Don't Speak" (number one for 16 weeks)
- 1997 Sugar Ray featuring Super Cat: "Fly" (number one for six weeks)
- 1997 Will Smith: "Men in Black" (number one for four weeks)
- 1997 The Cardigans: "Lovefool" (number two for eight weeks)
- 1998 Natalie Imbruglia: "Torn" (number one for 11 weeks)
- 1998 Goo Goo Dolls: "Iris" (number one for 18 weeks)

As debate and conflicts occurred more and more often, Billboard finally answered the requests of music industry artists and insiders to include airplay-only songs (or "album cuts") in the Hot 100, while the retail component was reduced from 40% to 25%.

=== EPs ===
Extended play (EP) releases were listed by Billboard on the Hot 100 and in pre-Hot 100 charts (Top 100) until the mid-to-late 1960s. With the growing popularity of albums, it was decided to move EPs (which typically contain four to six tracks) from the Hot 100 to the Billboard 200, where they are included to this day.

=== Digital downloads, online streaming, and bundles ===
Since February 12, 2005, the Billboard Hot 100 tracks paid digital downloads from such internet services as iTunes, Musicmatch, and Rhapsody. Billboard initially started tracking downloads in 2003 with the Hot Digital Tracks chart. However, these downloads did not count towards the Hot 100, and that chart (as opposed to Hot Digital Songs) counted each version of a song separately. This was the first major overhaul of the Hot 100's chart formula since December 1998.

The change in methodology has shaken up the chart considerably, with some songs debuting solely on the strength of robust online sales and others making drastic leaps. In recent years, several songs have achieved 80-to-90 position jumps in a single week after their digital components were made available on online music stores. Since 2006, the record for the largest single-week upward movement has been broken nine times.

In the issue dated August 11, 2007, Billboard began incorporating weekly data from streaming media and on-demand services into the Hot 100. The first two major companies to provide their statistics to Nielsen BDS every week were AOL Music and Yahoo! Music. On March 24, 2012, Billboard premiered its On-Demand Songs chart, which ranks web radio streams from services such as Spotify, as well as on-demand audio titles. Its data was then incorporated into the equation that compiles the Hot 100, and this was expanded to a broader Streaming Songs chart in January 2013. In February 2013, U.S. views for a song on YouTube were added to the Hot 100 formula. "Harlem Shake" was the first song to reach number one after the changes were made. Starting from the January 17, 2026-dated charts, YouTube stopped providing its streaming data to Billboard as a result of a dispute between the two over how ad-supported streams were counted towards the charts (including the Hot 100). The dispute was later resolved in November of the same year after Billboard adjusted its methodology on how it counted ad-supported streams, with YouTube announcing that it would start providing their data to Billboard again in 2027.

In July 2020, Billboard announced that it would no longer allow physical/digital bundles to be reported as digital sales. This refers to songs purchased alongside merchandise, either from an artist's website or through another vendor. The magazine stated that this was a tactic generally used by certain artists to boost their chart positions. Instead, such physical releases are now only counted when they are shipped to the consumer, rendering the tactic "ineffectual".

=== Remixes ===
A growing trend early in the first decade of the 21st century was to issue a song as a "remix" that was so different in structure and lyrical content from its original version that it was essentially a whole new song. Under normal circumstances, airplay points from a song's album version, "radio" mix, or dance music remix, etc., were all combined and factored into the song's performance on the Hot 100, as the structure, lyrics, and melody remained intact. Criticism began when songs were completely re-recorded to the point that they no longer resembled their original recordings. The first such example of this scenario is Jennifer Lopez's "I'm Real". Originally entering the Hot 100 in its album version, a "remix" featuring rapper Ja Rule was issued during its chart run. This new version proved to be more popular than the album version, and the track was propelled to number one.

To address this issue, Billboard now separates airplay points for a song's original version and its remix, if the remix is deemed a "new song". Since administering this new chart rule, several songs have charted twice, normally credited as "Part 1" and "Part 2". The remix rule is still in place.

=== Recurrents ===
Billboard, in an effort to allow the chart to remain as current as possible and to give representation to new and developing artists and tracks, has (since 1991) removed titles that have reached certain criteria regarding their current rank and number of weeks on the chart. Recurrent criteria have been modified several times, and (from 2015 up until October 25, 2025), a song was permanently moved to "recurrent status" if it had spent 20 weeks on the Hot 100 and fallen below position number 50. Additionally, descending songs were removed from the chart if ranking below number 25 after 52 weeks. Exceptions were made to re-releases and sudden resurgence in popularity of tracks that had taken a very long time to gain mainstream success. These rare cases are still handled on a case-by-case basis and ultimately determined by Billboard's chart managers and staff. Older songs were allowed to re-enter the Hot 100 provided they charted higher than number 50. Christmas songs in particular started to become a regular presence on the Hot 100 each December since the relaxation of recurrent rules in 2015, culminating in Mariah Carey's 1994 recording "All I Want for Christmas Is You" reaching No. 1 on the chart in December 2019.

Stricter changes were made to the recurrent rules; however, effective with the chart dated October 25, 2025, the start of the 2026 chart year for Billboard. While songs that fall below the top 50 with at least 20 weeks still go recurrent, if they are not making any gains in points, Billboard instituted new tiers for recurrency for the top 25 and top 50, introducing ones for the top 10 and top 5. Songs that fall below the top 25 and have at least 26 weeks (previously 52 weeks) go recurrent; those that fall below the top 10 with at least 52 weeks, as well as those that fall below the top five with at least 78 weeks, under the new rule, also go recurrent. Songs that are still gaining below those markers will be eligible to remain on the Hot 100 on a case-by-case basis. Plus, holiday songs will qualify to return above No. 50 regardless of total chart weeks and will then be subject to the rules noted above upon their descent. The same applies for newly-surging non-holiday catalog songs, with those without significant chart history eligible to debut at any rank, as considered individually.

This new recurrent rule was enacted due to the takeover of streaming, as the Hot 100 started reflecting repeat listening more than ever before, as well as radio stations keeping popular songs in heavy rotation for longer than ever before, as reflected in Billboard's airplay charts. That shift resulted in charts moving much more slowly than before. Following this change in late 2025, Billboard reported that, especially in recent years, songs have logged some of the longest Hot 100 runs to date, led by Teddy Swims' "Lose Control", which left the October 25 chart after a record 112-week stay.

=== Adjustment of tracking week ===
Billboard altered its tracking week for sales, streaming, and radio airplay to conform to a new Global Release Date, which now falls on Fridays in all major-market territories (United States product was formerly released on Tuesdays before June 2015). This modified tracking schedule took effect on the issue dated July 25, 2015.

== Year-end charts ==
Billboard's "chart year" runs from the first week of December to the final week in November. This altered calendar allows for Billboard to calculate year-end charts and release them in time for its final print issue in the last week of December.

Before Nielsen SoundScan, year-end singles charts were calculated by an inverse-point system based solely on a song's performance on the Hot 100 (for example, a song would be given one point for a week spent at position 100, two points for a week spent at position 99, and so forth, up to 100 points for each week spent at number one). Other factors, including the total weeks a song spent on the chart and at its peak position, were calculated into its year-end total.

After Billboard began obtaining sales and airplay information from Nielsen SoundScan, the year-end charts are now calculated by a cumulative total of yearlong sales, streaming, and airplay points. This gives a more accurate picture of any given year's most popular tracks, as the points accrued by one song during its week at number one in March might be less than those accrued by another song reaching number three in January. Songs at the peak of their popularity at the time of the November/December chart-year cutoff often end up ranked on the following year's chart as well, as their cumulative points are split between the two chart years, but often are ranked lower than they would have been had the peak occurred in a single year.

== Use in media ==
The Hot 100 served as the data source for the weekly radio countdown show American Top 40 for many years. This relationship ended on November 30, 1991, as American Top 40 started using the airplay-only side of the Hot 100 (then called Top 40 Radio Monitor). The ongoing splintering of Top 40 radio in the early 1990s led stations to lean into specific formats, meaning that practically no station would play the wide array of genres that typically composed each weekly Hot 100 chart.

An artist or band's ability to have hits on the Hot 100 across multiple decades is recognized as a sign of longevity and adaptability to changing musical styles. Only five artists had a Hot 100 Top 40 hit in each of the four decades from the 1980s through the 2010s: Michael Jackson, Madonna, "Weird Al" Yankovic, U2, and Kenny G. Mariah Carey is the first artist to have a number-one single in four different decades.

SiriusXM Pop2K uses the Hot 100 charts for the 2000s for the "Pop2Kountdown", where radio personality Rich Davis plays the top 30 songs on the Hot 100 from that specific week in a specific year from the 2000s. '90s on 9 also does a similar countdown show called the "Back in the Day Replay Countdown" hosted by Downtown Julie Brown; however, this focuses on the Hot 100 charts from the 1990s.

== Similar charts ==
A new chart, the Pop 100, was created by Billboard in February 2005 to answer criticism that the Hot 100 at the time was too dominated by hip hop and R&B. It was discontinued in June 2009 due to the charts becoming increasingly similar.

The Canadian Hot 100 was launched on June 16, 2007. Like the Hot 100 chart, it uses sales and airplay tracking compiled by Nielsen SoundScan and Broadcast Data Systems.

The Billboard Japan Hot 100 was launched in the issue dated May 31, 2008, using the same methodologies as the Hot 100 charts for the U.S. and Canada, using sales and airplay data from SoundScan Japan and radio tracking service Plantech.

The Vietnamese edition of Hot 100, Billboard Vietnam Hot 100, was launched on January 14, 2022.

== See also ==
- American Top 40
- Hot Latin Songs
- Bestseller
- Billboard charts
- Billboard Global 200
- Billboard Music Awards
- Chart-topper
- List of artists who reached number one in the United States
- List of best-selling music artists
- List of Billboard Hot 100 chart achievements and milestones
- List of Billboard Hot 100 number-one singles of the 2020s
- List of Billboard Hot 100 top-ten singles
- Lists of Billboard number-one singles
- Single certifications
- Rolling Stone Top 100
