= Vanderbilt Commodores football =

Vanderbilt University football team

2026 Vanderbilt Commodores football team
- First season: 1890; 136 years ago
- Athletic director: Candice Storey Lee
- General manager: Barton Simmons
- Head coach: Clark Lea; 5th season, 30–43 (.411)
- Location: Nashville, Tennessee
- Stadium: FirstBank Stadium (capacity: 35,000)
- Field: Dudley Field
- NCAA division: Division I FBS
- Conference: SEC
- Colors: Black and gold
- All-time record: 636–685–50 (.482)
- Bowl record: 5–4–1 (.550)

National championships
- Unclaimed: 1906, 1910, 1911, 1918, 1921, 1922

Conference championships
- SIAA: 1897, 1901, 1903, 1904, 1905, 1906, 1907, 1910, 1911, 1912, 1915, 1921 SoCon: 1922, 1923
- Consensus All-Americans: 7
- Rivalries: Tennessee (rivalry); Auburn (rivalry); Kentucky (rivalry); Ole Miss (rivalry); Georgia (rivalry); Georgia Tech (dormant); Sewanee (historical)

Uniforms
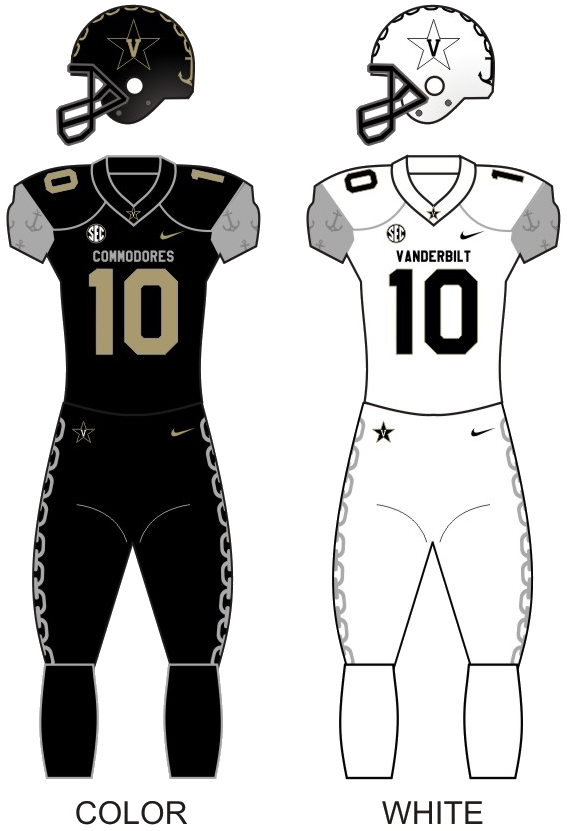
- Fight song: Dynamite!
- Mascot: Mr. C
- Marching band: Spirit of Gold Marching Band
- Outfitter: Nike
- Website: vucommodores.com

The Vanderbilt Commodores football program represents Vanderbilt University in the sport of American football. The Commodores compete in the Football Bowl Subdivision (FBS) of the National Collegiate Athletic Association (NCAA) within the Southeastern Conference (SEC). They are led by head coach Clark Lea. Vanderbilt plays home games at FirstBank Stadium, located on the university's Nashville, Tennessee campus.

== History ==
Vanderbilt adopted the nickname the Commodores after the 1897 season. 2025 marks the one hundred and thirty-sixth season for Vanderbilt football, the team has played in 1,346 games with a record of 625–671–50 (.483). The Commodores play in the Southeastern Conference (SEC), Vanderbilt has an all-time SEC record of 148–461–17 (.250). All conferences Vanderbilt has played in, SoCon, SIAA, and SEC total records are 295–499–32 (.377). The most wins in a single football season was nine, happening four times, the last being 2013. In 2025, the Commodores won 10 games in the regular season. Vanderbilt has had eight undefeated seasons, the last being 1944.

== Head coaches ==
Vanderbilt has had seven coaches who have led the Commodores to a postseason bowl appearance: Art Guepe, Steve Sloan, George MacIntyre, Bobby Johnson, James Franklin, Derek Mason, and Clark Lea. Four have led them to a conference championship: R. G. Acton, W. H. Watkins, James R. Henry, and Dan McGugin. McGugin is the leader in seasons coached and games won, with 198 victories during his 30 years at Vanderbilt. He was awarded two National Championships retroactively by Clyde Berryman.

Of the 29 different head coaches who have led the Commodores, McGugin, Ray Morrison, Red Sanders, and Bill Edwards have been inducted into the College Football Hall of Fame.

Vanderbilt is led by current head coach Clark Lea, who was hired on December 14, 2020.

== Conference affiliations ==
Vanderbilt has been a member of the Southeastern Conference since its founding in 1932.

Vanderbilt has been affiliated with the following conferences.

- Independent (1890–1891)
- SIAA (1892–1921)
- Southern Conference (1922–1932)
- Southeastern Conference (1933–present)

== Championships ==
=== Conference championships ===
Vanderbilt has won 14 conference championships, with six shared and eight won outright.

Season	Conference	Coach	Overall record	Conference record
1897	SIAA	R. G. Acton	6–0–1	3–0–1
1901	SIAA	W. H. Watkins	6–1–1	6–0–1
1903†	SIAA	James H. Henry	6–1–1	5–1–1
1904	SIAA	Dan McGugin	9–0	5–0
1905	SIAA	Dan McGugin	7–1	6–0
1906†	SIAA	Dan McGugin	8–1	6–0
1907	SIAA	Dan McGugin	5–1–1	4–0
1910†	SIAA	Dan McGugin	8–0–1	5–0
1911	SIAA	Dan McGugin	8–1	6–0
1912	SIAA	Dan McGugin	8–1–1	4–0–1
1915	SIAA	Dan McGugin	9–1	5–0
1921†	SIAA	Dan McGugin	7–0–1	4–0–1
1922†	SoCon	Dan McGugin	8–0–1	3–0
1923†	SoCon	Dan McGugin	5–2–1	3–0–1

† Co-champions

=== Unclaimed national championships ===
Vanderbilt has been awarded 6 national championships for the years 1906, 1910, 1911, 1918, 1921, and 1922. The school does not claim any of these national titles.

Season	Coach	Overall record	Conference record	National Championship Selector
1906	Dan McGugin	8–1–0	6–0–0	Billingsley Report
1910	Dan McGugin	8–0–1	5–0–0	James Howell
1911	Dan McGugin	8–1–0	5–0–0	Billingsley Report
1918	Dan McGugin	4–2–0	4–0–0	David Wilson
1921	Dan McGugin	7–0–1	4–0–1	Berryman QPRS, James Howell
1922	Dan McGugin	8–0–1	3–0–0	Berryman QPRS, James Howell

== Undefeated seasons ==
Vanderbilt has had 8 undefeated seasons in the years 1890, 1897, 1904, 1910, 1921, 1922, 1943, and 1944.

== Bowl games ==
Vanderbilt has been invited to 11 bowl games, with the Commodores garnering a record of 5–5–1 in bowl games.

Season	Coach	Bowl	Opponent	Result
1955	Art Guepe	Gator Bowl	Auburn	W 25–13
1974	Steve Sloan	Peach Bowl	Texas Tech	T 6–6
1982	George MacIntyre	Hall of Fame Classic	Air Force	L 28–36
2008	Bobby Johnson	Music City Bowl	Boston College	W 16–14
2011	James Franklin	Liberty Bowl	Cincinnati	L 24–31
2012	James Franklin	Music City Bowl	NC State	W 38–24
2013	James Franklin	BBVA Compass Bowl	Houston	W 41–24
2016	Derek Mason	Independence Bowl	NC State	L 17–41
2018	Derek Mason	Texas Bowl	Baylor	L 38–45
2024	Clark Lea	Birmingham Bowl	Georgia Tech	W 35–27
2025	Clark Lea	ReliaQuest Bowl	Iowa	L 27–34

== Rivalries ==
=== Georgia ===
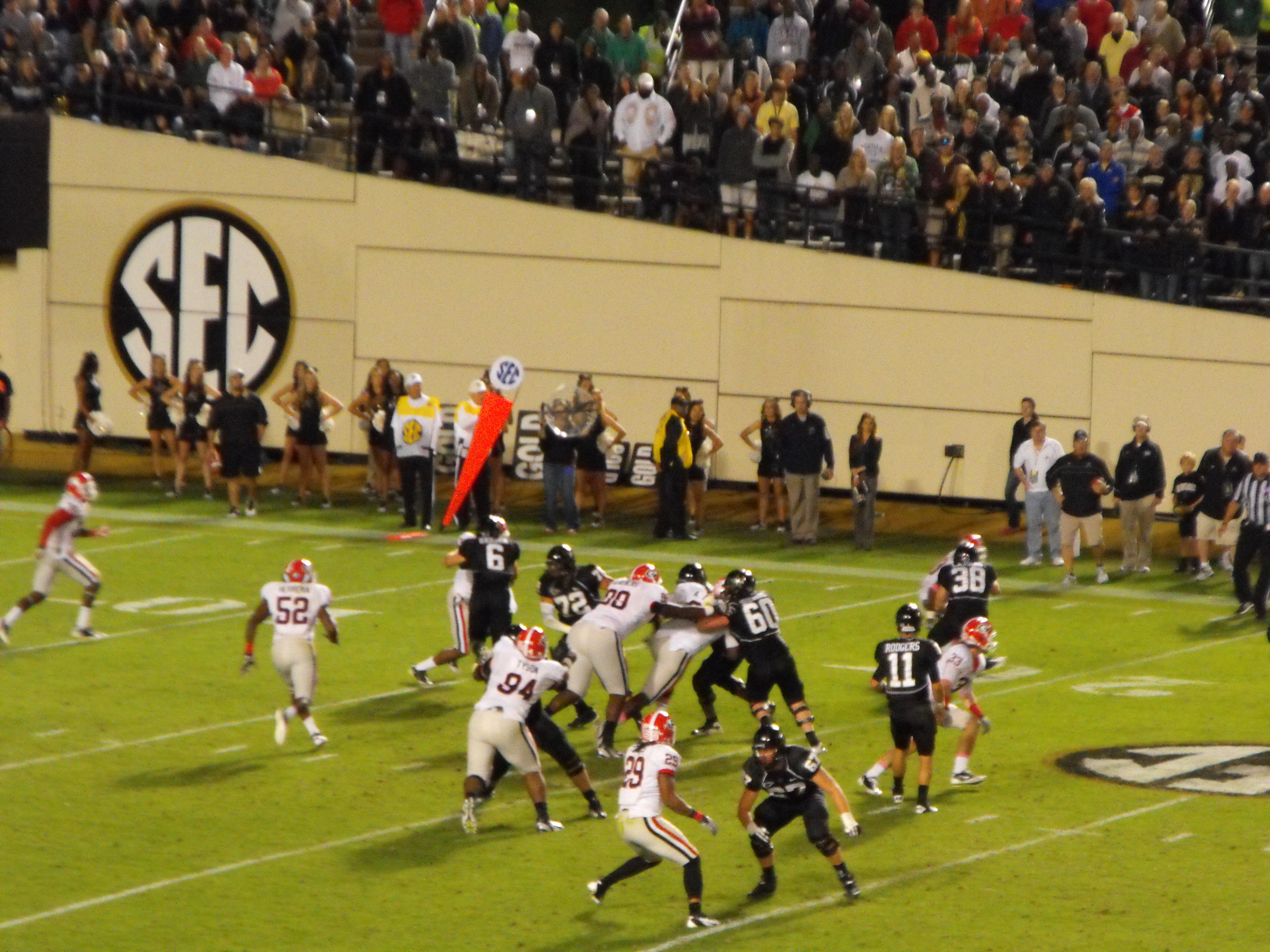
Georgia Vanderbilt 2011

Having started in 1893, the Georgia–Vanderbilt football series was played annually from 1968 to 2023. The two were divisional opponents in the SEC East from 1992 to 2023. The series, which rotates between Nashville, Tennessee, and Athens, Georgia, stands with Georgia leading 61–20–2 through the 2023 season. Under the new SEC format, they are not scheduled to play each other again in the regular season until at least 2026.

=== Kentucky ===
Having started in 1896, the Kentucky–Vanderbilt football series has been played annually since 1953. The two were divisional opponents in the SEC East. The series, which rotates between Nashville, Tennessee and Lexington, Kentucky, is led by Kentucky at 48–44–4 with the average score being Vanderbilt 17.2-Kentucky 16.9

=== Ole Miss ===
Ole Miss was Vanderbilt's cross-divisional rival in the SEC from 1992 to 2023.

Vanderbilt and Ole Miss have played 98 times since 1894. Ole Miss leads the series 56–40–2. The largest margin of victory was by 91 points won by Vanderbilt in 1915. Vanderbilt also holds the longest win streak in the series (18) from 1894 to 1938. Under the new SEC format, they are not scheduled to play again in the regular season until at least 2026.

=== Tennessee ===
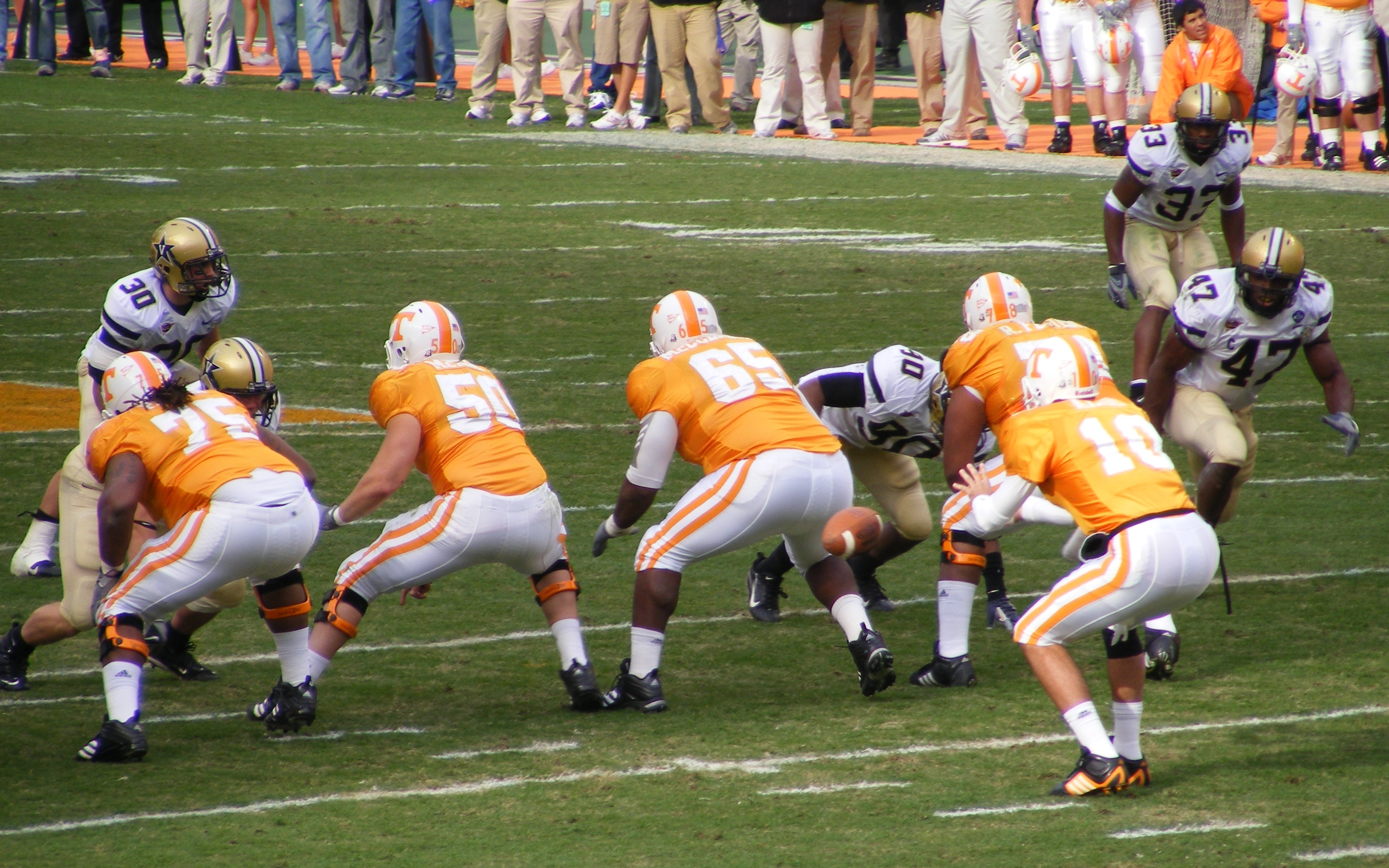
Tennessee vs. Vanderbilt 2007

Vanderbilt and Tennessee have played 117 times since 1892, Tennessee leads the series 79–33–5. When the rivalry first started Vanderbilt dominated by taking 19 of the first 24 with 3 ties. But from 1928 to 2022 however, Tennessee has dominated going 77–14–2 against Vanderbilt. The largest margin of victory for Vanderbilt was by 76 points in 1918 at Old Dudley Field in Nashville. (Vanderbilt 76, Tennessee 0) The largest defeat was 65 points in 1994 at Vanderbilt Stadium (Tennessee 65, Vanderbilt 0). The longest win streaks for Vanderbilt is (9) from 1901 to 1913. The longest win streak for Tennessee is 22, from 1983 to 2004.

=== Georgia Tech (dormant) ===
The Commodores first met the Georgia Tech Yellow Jackets in 1892 in Atlanta, Georgia with Vanderbilt winning 20–10. Since 1924, the winning team in the series has received a silver-plated cowbell with the year and final score of each game engraved on it. The trophy was created by Ed F. Cavaleri, who was described by the Atlanta Constitution as “a faithful Georgia Tech supporter though he did not attend the Jacket institution,” according to Georgia Tech's website. Cavaleri purchased a cowbell at an Atlanta hardware store to use as a noise-maker while on his way to a game in 1924. The Commodores defeated Georgia Tech 3–0, however another fan in attendance suggested that Cavaleri award the bell to the winning team. The tradition was born and Cavaleri attended every game between the two teams from 1924 to 1967. The cowbell has a gold plate screwed into each side, with “GEORGIA TECH-VANDERBILT FOOTBALL TROPHY” inscribed at the top. Three columns list the year of each game, Vanderbilt's points scored and Georgia Tech's points scored. The results of the games from 1924 to 1967 are engraved on one side; the results from 2002, 2003, 2009 and 2016 are on the other. Vanderbilt is 16–20-3 against Georgia Tech in 39 games. The Commodores won the most recent matchup 35–27 in the 2024 Birmingham Bowl.

=== Sewanee (historical) ===
Vanderbilt and the Sewanee Tigers were both founding members of the Southern Intercollegiate Athletic Association (SIAA), the Southern Conference, and the Southeastern Conference (SEC). It is the oldest of Vanderbilt's rivalries; dating back to 1891 when Vanderbilt played its second football game. Vanderbilt leads the series 40–8–4. The largest margin of victory was in 1905 when Vanderbilt won 68–4. Usually played towards the end of the season on Thanksgiving Day, the two teams have not met again since 1944 and are unlikely to anytime soon as Sewanee plays in NCAA Division III.

== Uniforms ==
Traditionally, Vanderbilt has featured differing designs of gold helmets, black jerseys, and gold or black pants at home, and gold helmets, white jerseys and gold, or white pants on the road. Meanwhile, the traditional alternate uniform saw gold helmets and jerseys matched with white pants.

The James Franklin (2011–2013), and Derek Mason (2014–2020) eras saw the introduction of several new combinations- including "blackout” (i.e. all black), and "whiteout" (i.e. all white) uniforms. The team's gold alternate jerseys were also re-designed with the addition of black shoulders and a more muted gold. Eventually, battleship gray was incorporated as well.

The Clark Lea (2021–Present) era has seen a return to traditional gold helmets (note: featuring a modernized “V” logo), black jerseys, and gold pants at home, and gold helmets, white jerseys, and gold (or white) pants on the road. Before the 2024 season, Vanderbilt introduced new all white ("whiteout"), and all black ("blackout") uniforms. Most recently, in advance of the 2026 season, Vanderbilt announced new gold jerseys and pants, opening up the possibility of several different combinations.

== Individual awards ==
=== College Football Hall of Fame ===
Vanderbilt Commodore football personnel have been inducted into the National Football Foundation's National College Football Hall of Fame.

==== Players ====
Name	Position	Career
John J. Tigert	HB	1901–1903
Josh Cody	T	1914–1916, 1919
Lynn Bomar	End	1921–1924
William Spears	QB	1925–1927
Carl Hinkle	C	1935–1937

==== Coaches ====
Name	Career
Dan McGugin	1904–1917, 1919–1934
Ray Morrison	1918, 1935–1939
Red Sanders	1940–1942, 1946–1948
Bill Edwards	1949–1952

=== All-Americans ===
Player	Year	Position
Eli Stowers	2025	TE
Zach Cunningham	2016	LB
Jordan Matthews	2013	WR
Casey Hayward	2011	CB
D.J. Moore	2008	DB
Earl Bennett	2006	WR
Jamie Winborn	1999	LB
Jamie Duncan	1997	LB
Bill Marinangel	1996	P
Boo Mitchell	1988	WR
Chris Gaines	1987	LB
Ricky Anderson	1984	P
Leonard Coleman	1983	DB
Chuck Scott	1983	TE
Jim Arnold	1982	P
Allama Matthews	1982	TE
Preston Brown	1979	Back
Barry Burton	1974	TE
Bob Asher	1969	T
Chip Healy	1968	LB
George Diedrich	1958	G
Charley Horton	1955	RB
Bill Wade	1951	QB
Bob Werckle	1951	T
Bucky Curtis	1950	End
Bob Gude	1941	C
Carl Hinkle	1937	C
Pete Gracey	1932	C
Bull Brown	1929	G
Dick Abernathy	1928	End
Bill Spears	1926, 1927	QB
Gil Reese	1923, 1924	Back
Henry Wakefield	1923, 1924	End
Oliver Kuhn	1922	QB
Lynn Bomar	1922, 1923	End
Josh Cody	1914, 1915, 1919	T
Irby Curry	1916	QB
Lewie Hardage	1912	Back
Ray Morrison	1911	QB
W. E. Metzger	1910	G
Bob Blake	1907	E
Owsley Manier	1906	Back

=== Consensus All-American ===
Vanderbilt has had eight consensus All-Americans in its history. In 2016, Zach Cunningham became the first unanimous All-American in Vanderbilt's history.

Player	Year	Position
Lynn Bomar	1923	E
Hek Wakefield	1924	E
Pete Gracey	1932	C
George Deiderich	1958	G
Jim Arnold	1982	P
Ricky Anderson	1984	P
Zach Cunningham	2016	LB
Eli Stowers	2025	TE

=== Other national player awards ===
==== John Mackey Award ====
Presented to the top tight end.

Player	Year
Eli Stowers	2025

==== Johnny Unitas Golden Arm Award ====
Presented to the top upperclass quarterback (junior or senior).

Player	Year
Diego Pavia	2025

==== William V. Campbell Trophy ====
Presented to the college football player with the best combination of overall leadership, academics, and performance on the field.

Player	Year
Eli Stowers	2025

=== National coaching awards ===
==== Eddie Robinson Coach of the Year Award ====
Presented to the top FBS head coach, as determined by the Football Writers Association of America.

Coach	Year
Clark Lea	2025

=== Conference recognition ===
Vanderbilt Commodores personnel, including coaches and players, have received recognition from the Southeastern Conference for their performances on the football field.

==== Most Valuable Player ====
Five Vanderbilt players have been awarded Most Valuable Player, with three of them being awarded over a six-year span to Commodores.

Name	Year
Willie Geny	1935
Carl Hinkle	1937
Jack Jenkins	1941
Bill Wade	1951
Bob Goodridge	1967

==== Offensive Player of the Year ====
Two Vanderbilt players have won Offensive Player of the Year honors.

Name	Year
Jay Cutler	2005
Diego Pavia	2025

==== Freshman of the Year ====
Two players have won Freshman of the Year while at Vanderbilt.

Name	Year
Kwane Doster	2002
Warren Norman	2009

==== Newcomer of the Year ====
The SEC introduced its Newcomer of the Year award in 2024 to honor the conference's most outstanding non-freshman in his first year at an SEC school. A Vanderbilt player was this award's inaugural recipient.

Name	Year
Diego Pavia	2024

==== Best Blocker ====
One Commodore has won Best Blocker, doing so twice.

Name	Year
Jack Jenkins	1941, 1942

==== Best Wide Receiver ====
Name	Year
Earl Bennett	2005–2007

==== Coach of the Year ====
Six Vanderbilt coaches have won Coach of the Year honors over the past century, with one having received the award in back-to-back seasons.

Name	Year
Ray Morrison	1937
Red Sanders	1941
Art Guepe	1955
George MacIntyre	1982
Bobby Johnson	2008
Clark Lea	2024
Clark Lea	2025

== Future opponents ==
=== Conference opponents ===
From 1992 to 2023, Vanderbilt played in the East Division of the SEC and played each opponent in the division each year along with several teams from the West Division. The SEC expanded to 16 teams and eliminated its two divisions in 2024, causing a new scheduling format for the Commodores to play against the other members of the conference. Only the 2024 conference schedule was announced on June 14, 2023, while the conference considered a new format for the future. The 2025 conference schedule was announced on March 20, 2024, in which teams would play the same opponents in 2025 that they played in 2024, with sites changed for equal home and away competition over the course of the two seasons.

The conference schedule has been expanded to 9 games effective in 2026. Each team has three designated annual opponents, with the other 12 conference members alternating on and off the schedule, in groups of six, every two years. Also, each SEC member is required to schedule at least one power conference opponent out of conference each season.

==== 2026 Conference Schedule ====
Opponent
Alabama
Arkansas
at Auburn
at Florida
at Georgia
at Kentucky
at Mississippi State
Ole Miss
Tennessee

=== Non-conference opponents ===
Announced schedules as of September 8, 2026

2026	2027	2028	2029	2030	2031	2032	2033
Austin Peay	Eastern Kentucky	Tennessee State	UT Martin	North Alabama	West Georgia	at Stanford	Stanford
Delaware	at Stanford	Virginia	Purdue		at Virginia		
NC State	Kennesaw State	Akron					
