= Vanderbilt Commodores =

Intercollegiate sports teams of Vanderbilt University

- University: Vanderbilt University
- Nickname: Commodores
- NCAA: Division I (FBS)
- Conference: SEC (primary); American (women's lacrosse); CUSA (bowling)
- Athletic director: Candice Storey Lee
- Location: Nashville, Tennessee
- Varsity teams: 17
- Football stadium: FirstBank Stadium
- Basketball arena: Memorial Gymnasium
- Baseball stadium: Hawkins Field
- Volleyball arena: Memorial Gymnasium
- Other venues: Multipurpose Facility; Vanderbilt Track
- Colors: Black and gold
- Mascot: Mr. C
- Fight song: "Dynamite"
- Website: vucommodores.com

SEC logo in Vanderbilt's colors

The Vanderbilt Commodores are the intercollegiate athletic teams that represent Vanderbilt University, located in Nashville, Tennessee. Vanderbilt fields 17 varsity teams (6 men's teams and 11 women's teams), 14 of which compete at the National Collegiate Athletic Association (NCAA) Division I level as a member of the Southeastern Conference (SEC). Vanderbilt's women's lacrosse team plays in the American Conference. The bowling team plays in Conference USA (CUSA), which absorbed Vanderbilt's former bowling home of the Southland Bowling League after the 2022–23 season. The University of Tennessee Volunteers are Vanderbilt's primary athletic rival, and the only other SEC team in Tennessee.

== History ==
Vanderbilt is a charter member of the Southeastern Conference and is the conference's only private school. With approximately 6,400 undergraduates, the school is also by far the smallest in the conference; the University of Mississippi, the next smallest, has nearly twice as many undergraduate students. Vanderbilt fields fewer teams than any of its rivals and sometimes lacks the national prominence enjoyed by schools such as the University of Florida or the University of Kentucky. Men's and women's tennis and men's and women's basketball are traditionally Vanderbilt's strongest sports, with the more recently founded women's lacrosse and bowling programs as well as the long-standing men's baseball program experiencing national success, winning the 2014 and 2019 College World Series. And being the national runner up in the 2015 and 2021 College World Series. After enjoying success in the first half of the 20th century, the football program struggled through the beginning of the 21st century. In the 2008–09 season, however, the Vanderbilt football team posted a winning season and won its first bowl game in 53 years. Under previous coach James Franklin, the football program enjoyed somewhat of a renaissance; since Franklin's arrival at Vanderbilt in 2011, the Commodores have appeared in consecutive bowl games for the first time in school history (2011 and 2012), and the 2012 team posted Vanderbilt's first 9-win season in over 80 years.

=== Lack of athletic department ===
In September 2003, Vanderbilt disbanded its athletic department. Intercollegiate athletics are now administered as a part of the university's Division of Student Life, which oversees all student organizations and activities. Vanderbilt is currently the only Division I school without a separate athletic department. In making this decision, Chancellor Gordon Gee cited a need to reform college athletics, returning the emphasis to the student half of student-athletes.

=== Mascot history ===
Vanderbilt's intercollegiate athletics teams are nicknamed the Commodores, in honor of the nickname given to Cornelius Vanderbilt, who made his fortune in shipping. Fans often refer to Vanderbilt athletic teams as "Dores" or use the cheer "Go Dores!"

The term commodore was used by the Navy during the mid- to late nineteenth century. A commodore was the commanding officer of a task force of ships, and therefore higher in rank than a captain but lower in rank than an admiral. It was the highest rank in the United States Navy until the Civil War. The closest warfighting rank in today's Navy is rear admiral lower half. (In the British Royal Navy, the designation of commodore was applied to the commanding officer.)

Since the term was used most during the late nineteenth century—and because it was then that Cornelius received his nickname—Vanderbilt's mascot is always portrayed as a naval officer from the 1880s, complete with chops, cutlass, and nineteenth-century naval regalia.

=== School colors ===
The school colors are black and gold. Opinions vary as to the reason for selecting black and gold as the colors for Vanderbilt's teams. Some say the original colors were orange and black, given to the university by Judge W.L. Granbery of Princeton. Others say that Commodore Vanderbilt's legacy was called upon to develop school colors for the university that bears his name: black for the magnate's control of coal and gold for his money.

When questioned about the subject in the 1930s, the few remaining members of the school's first football squad from 1890 did not recall why they suddenly began appearing in black and gold. Whatever the source of the colors, by 1892, the Commodores were known by the colors that Vanderbilt fans still wear today.

=== Traditions and rivalries ===
Rivalries

Vanderbilt's primary rival in almost every sport is the University of Tennessee. There is also a rivalry with the University of Kentucky in basketball. In addition, the Commodores' second-oldest rivalry is with Ole Miss, and the two schools play each other every year as SEC cross-division "permanent opponents". In addition, Vanderbilt and the University of Louisville of the ACC play for the "Battle of the Barrel" each year in baseball.

Football gameday traditions

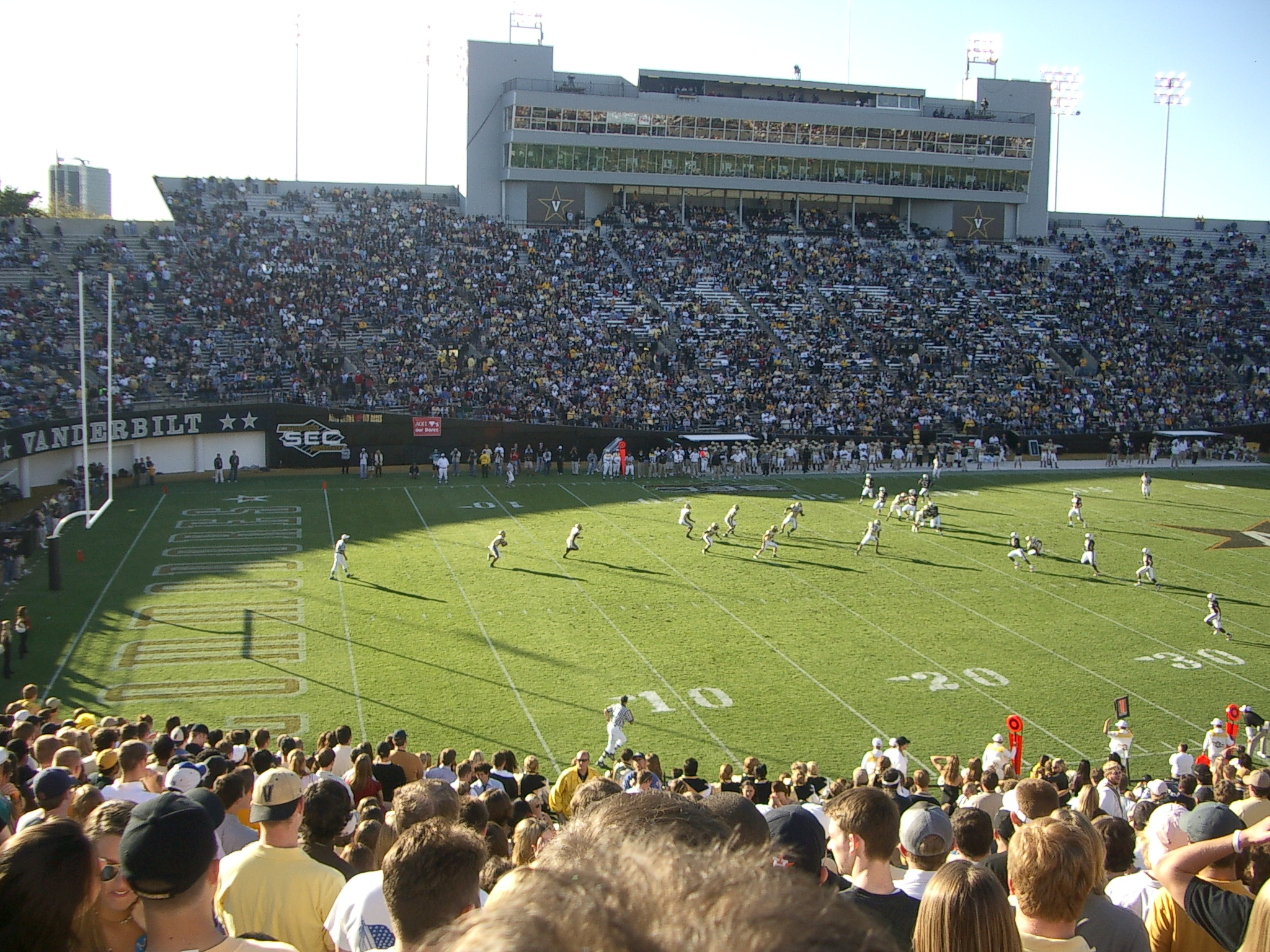
FirstBank Stadium in 2007

Vanderbilt has a number of football traditions: the "Commodore Creed" in the football locker room; the "Corridor of Captains" that honors Vanderbilt's athletics history; the "Star Walk" with fans, cheerleaders, and the Spirit of Gold Marching Band; the "Star V," an on-field formation by the marching band; the "Admiral", a foghorn from a U.S. Navy battleship that blows after every Vanderbilt score; "Mr. C," the mascot; the "Anchor Dash" by first-year students rushing the football field before kickoff of each season's home opener; the "Victory Flag" that is raised over Dudley Field after home wins; and the singing of the "Alma Mater" at the conclusion of a game (in most sports), win or lose.

Fight song

The Vanderbilt fight song, "Dynamite," was written by student Francis Craig in 1924. The song references the vigor with which Vanderbilt plays and the enthusiasm of the university's fans, who cheer regardless of the outcome of the game.

VU hand sign

Formed by extending the thumb, index, and middle fingers of the hand (similar to the Serbian three-finger salute), the resulting shape forms a "V" and "U". It was introduced by Vanderbilt's cheerleaders in 2003.

== Varsity teams ==
Men's sports	Women's sports
Baseball	Basketball
Basketball	Bowling
Cross country	Cross country
Football	Golf
Golf	Lacrosse
Tennis	Soccer
	Swimming & diving
	Tennis
	Track & field^{†}
	Volleyball
† – Track and field includes both indoor and outdoor.

=== Baseball ===
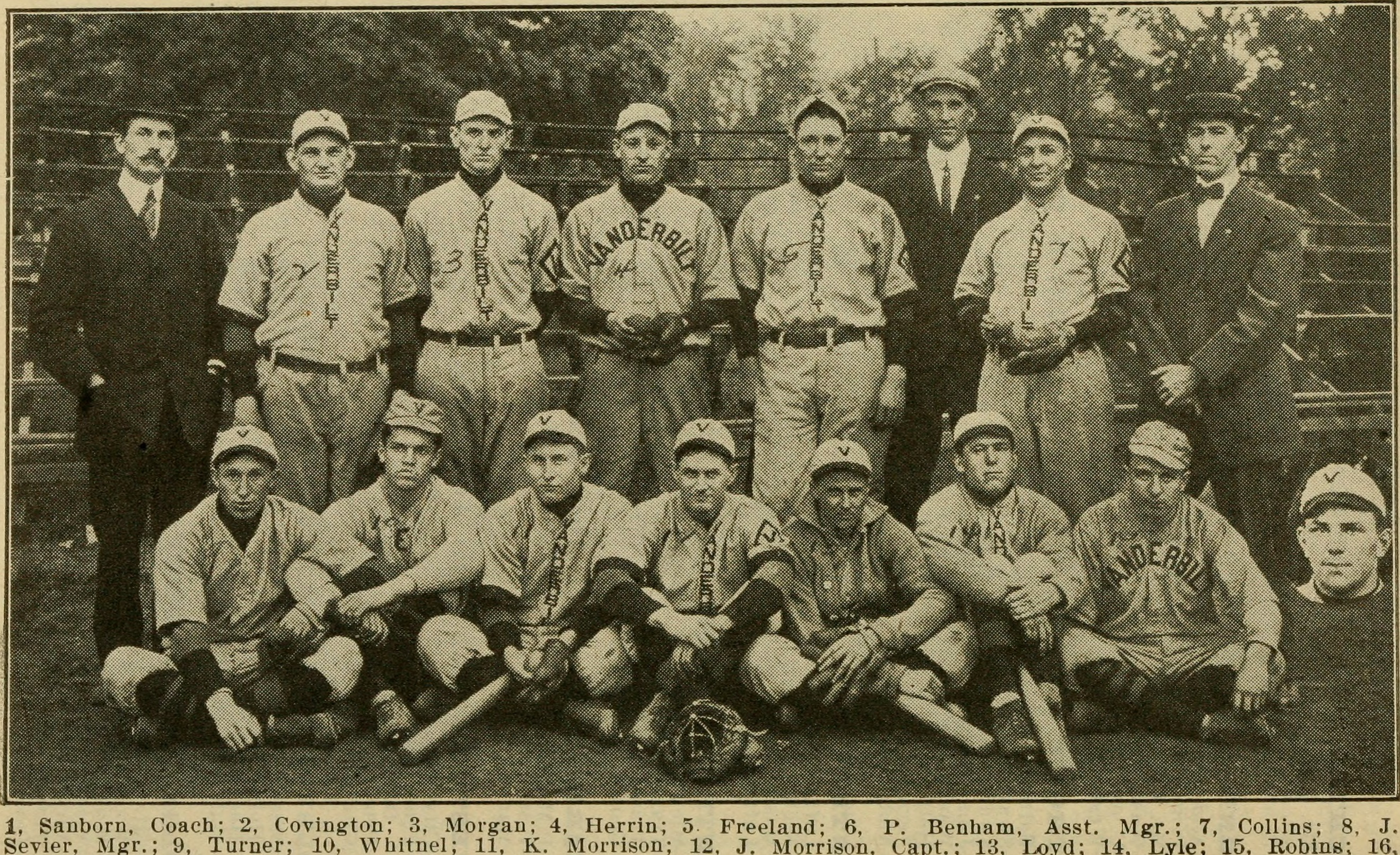
Vanderbilt baseball team in 1913

Baseball has been a part of Vanderbilt athletics since its official debut in 1886. The sport started out as a two-game schedule which featured a draw between Vanderbilt and then conference rival Sewanee. As the number of games increased the game became more and more popular especially in 1921 when Vanderbilt (20–8) first reached twenty wins in a season and won the Southern Conference baseball championship. Manager Bill Schwartz who formerly coached the Nashville Vols (1917, 1924–40, 1952) helped bring Vanderbilt to national prominence. Under his reign he led the Commodores to a 155–112–1 record which still ranks third all-time in victories at Vanderbilt. Under the direction of Larry Schmittou (1968–1978) the Commodores found even more success as the 1971 team began a four-year streak as SEC Eastern Divisional Champs with a 34–19 record. He also guided Vanderbilt to back-to-back SEC conference titles in 1973 and 1974 while being awarded Coach-of-the-Year honors. Schmittou currently ranks second all-time in Vanderbilt wins (306–252–1) and has coached 20 All-SEC players, 14 of which were drafted in the MLB draft.

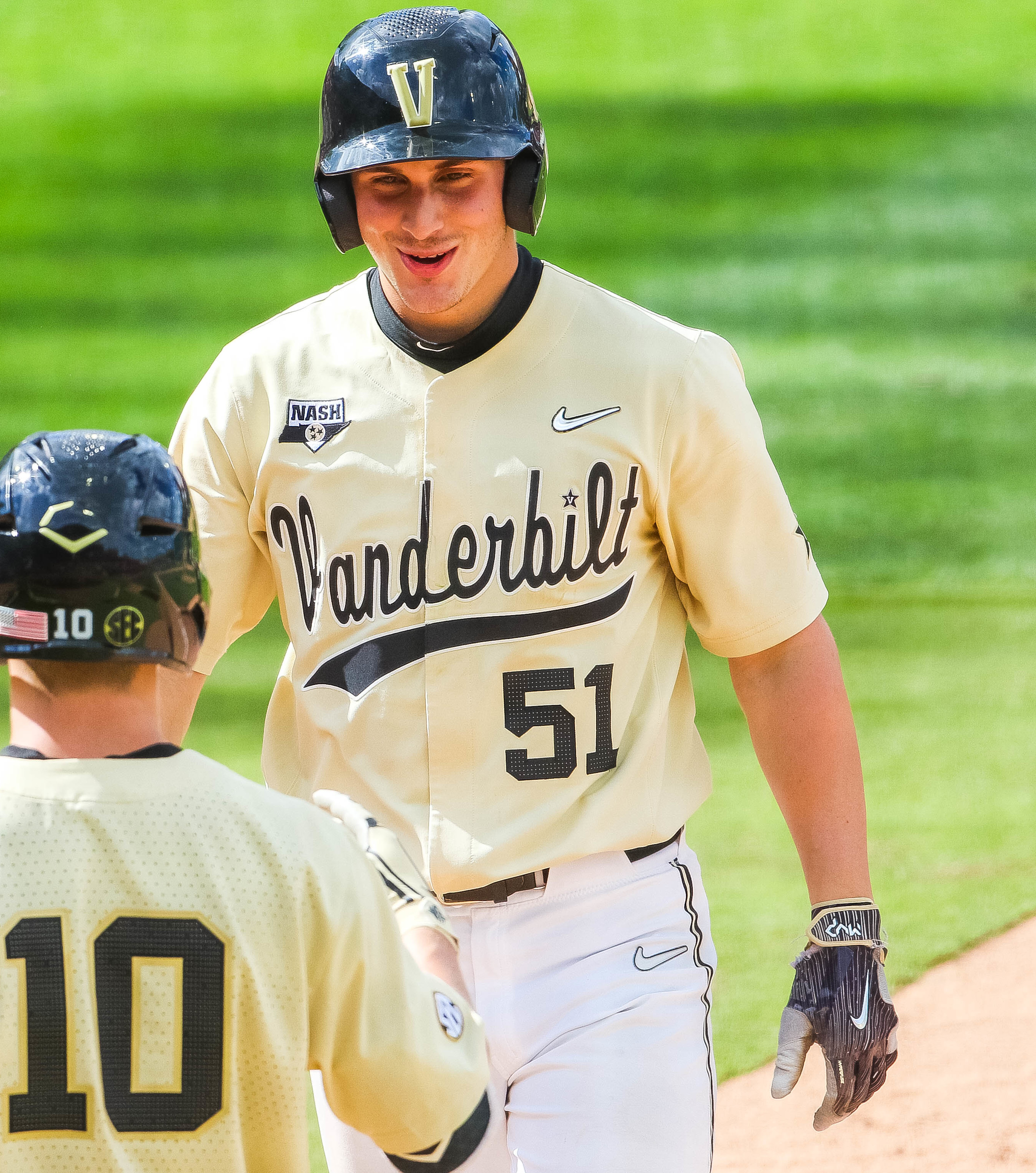
JJ Bleday with the Vanderbilt Commodores in 2019

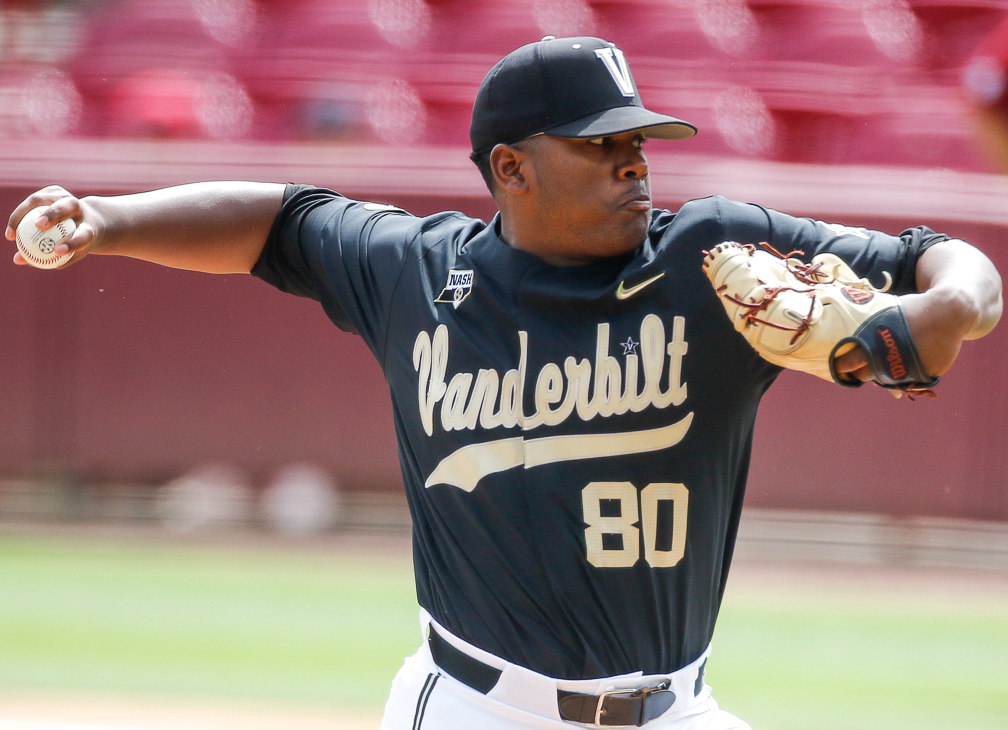
Kumar Rocker pitching for the Vanderbilt Commodores during a game in 2019

Tim Corbin (2003–present) has led Vanderbilt baseball into national prominence with players like Jeremy Sowers, David Price, Casey Weathers, Sonny Gray, Jensen Lewis and Pedro Álvarez. Vanderbilt's baseball team has enjoyed a great deal of success under his reign. The team qualified for the NCAA Super Regionals in 2004, had the nation's top recruiting class in 2005 according to Baseball America made the NCAA field again in 2006, and won the 2007 SEC regular-season and SEC tournament crowns. The Commodores were ranked first in most polls for a large portion of the 2007 season and earned the #1 national seed for the 2007 NCAA tournament. In 2011, the team was ranked as high as #1 and won the SEC regular-season title. That year, the team entered the NCAA Regionals with a #6 national seed and went undefeated through Regionals and Super Regionals to enter the College World Series for the first time. That year Vanderbilt also broke a SEC record of most players drafted in MLB with 12 players, breaking Auburn's record of 11.

Vanderbilt won the 2014 College World Series, the school's first national championship in any men's sport. The team returned to the national championship series in 2015, finishing as runners-up to Virginia.

Vanderbilt's 2019 baseball team compiled a 59–12 record and won the 2019 College World Series in addition to the SEC regular-season and tournament titles. Freshman Kumar Rocker was named the Most Outstanding Player of the College World Series and Freshman of the Year.

=== Basketball ===
==== Men's basketball ====
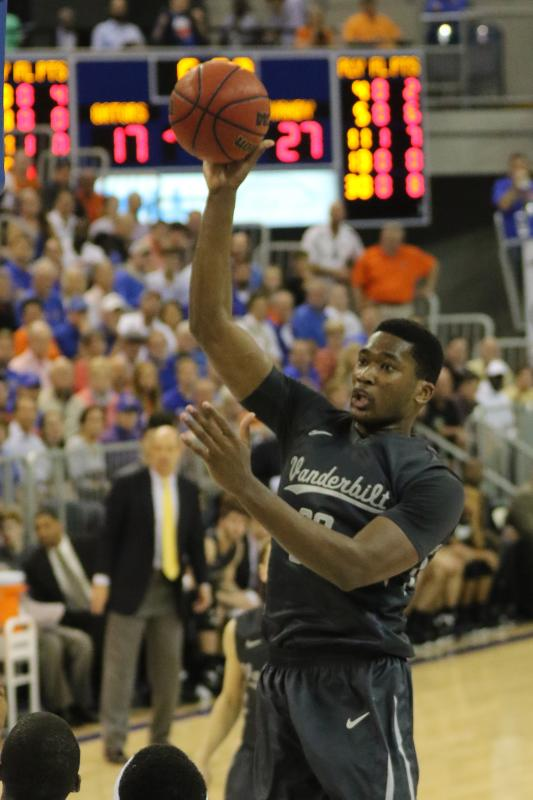
Damian Jones with the Vanderbilt Commodores in 2016

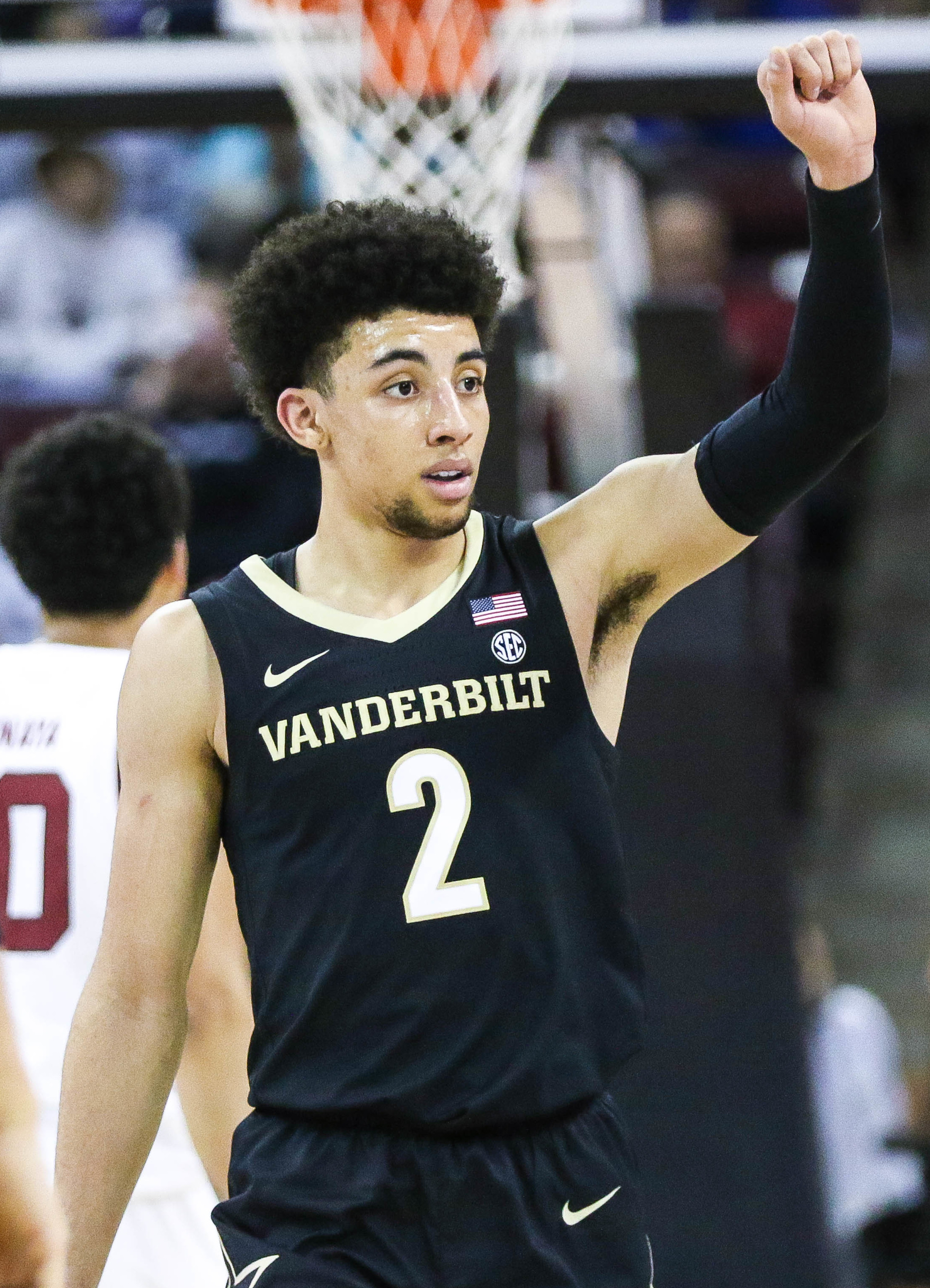
Scotty Pippen Jr. with the Vanderbilt Commodores in 2020

Vanderbilt basketball began on February 7, 1893, with a 9–6 victory over the Nashville YMCA, making it the first basketball game played by a collegiate team. It would take several years for the Commodores to make an impact in the game. In December 1900, the school first produced a formal basketball team coached by W.D. Weatherford. The first actual schedule for Vanderbilt consisted of three games against the Nashville YMCA and one against the Nashville Athletic Club. That year the Commodores lost their first meeting against the YMCA but managed to finish their season 2–2. Vanderbilt's first modern basketball team began with the hiring of Bob Polk (1948–58, 1960–61) as the school's first full-time basketball coach. During that time, Polk was able to recruit Vanderbilt's first scholarship player, Billy Joe Adcock, who would later become Vanderbilt's first All-American. From 1982 to 1989, Vanderbilt found success under the coaching of C.M. Newton who was able to bring Vanderbilt to new heights. In 1988, Vanderbilt managed to make it to the Sweet Sixteen in the NCAA tournament with the help of center and SEC Player of the Year Will Perdue. Newton was a two-time SEC Coach of the Year and was able to coach other notable players, including Phil Cox, Jeff Turner and Frank Kornet. In 1990, coach Eddie Fogler (1990–93) led Vanderbilt to the NIT championship, which remains Vanderbilt's only national tournament title. In 1992, the Commodores (28–6) managed to win their third and SEC title and a trip to the Sweet Sixteen with the help of Duke transfer Billy McCaffrey. Presently, Kevin Stallings is in his eighth season leading the Commodores. Under his guidance Vanderbilt has appeared in two NIT's and advanced to the Sweet Sixteen of the NCAA tournament. In 2004 Matt Freije became the Commodores all-time leading scorer with 1,891 points. Since the 2000s Vanderbilt has been able to produce several important players including Greg LaPointe, Russell Lakey, Scott Hundley, Corey Smith, Mario Moore, Julian Terrell, Shan Foster, Derrick Byars (2007 SEC Player of the Year), John Jenkins, Festus Ezeli, Jeffery Taylor and Darius Garland.

The Vanderbilt men have an overall record entering the 2007–08 season of 1,378–995. Their home record in Memorial Gymnasium is 650–184. They have made nine NCAA tournament appearances including four in the Sweet Sixteen and one Elite Eight. The Commodores have made 11 NIT (18–10) appearances with one championship (1990) and one Runner-up (1994). The men's basketball program is one of three Division I programs to hit at least one 3-pointer in every game since the 3-point line was implemented in the 1986–1987 season. Princeton and UNLV are the other two.

==== Women's basketball ====
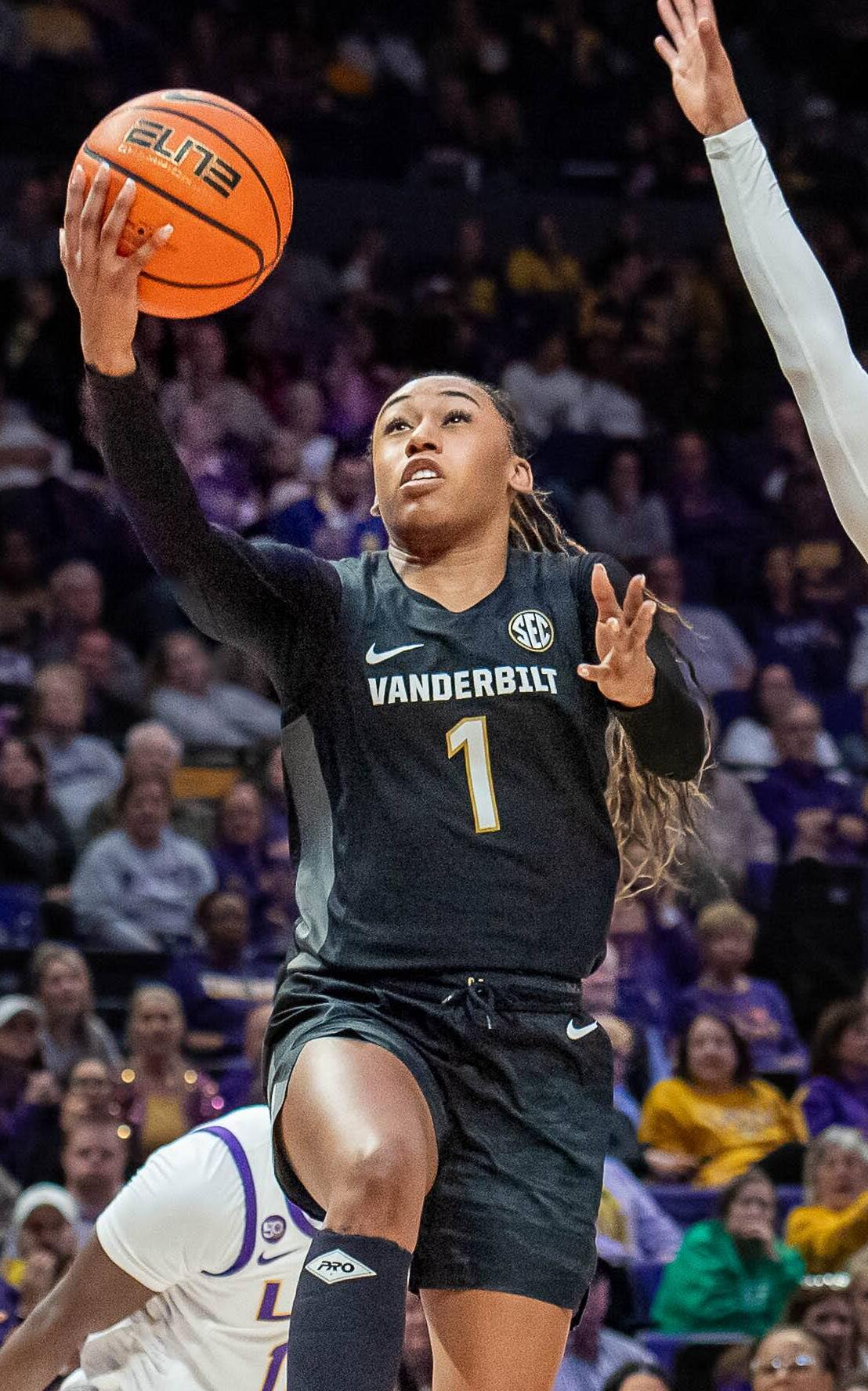
Mikayla Blakes with the Vanderbilt Commodores in 2025

The first Vanderbilt women's basketball game was in March 1897. During that time their schedule consisted of five games which expanded as the game became more popular nationally. The Lady Commodores began their modern and successful period when Joe Pepper (1977–80) was named part-time coach. Phil Lee (1980–91) became the school's first full-time coach in 1980 and helped lead the Lady Dores to their first 20 win season in 1981 and an appearance in the AIAW women's basketball tournament. The Vanderbilt women captured the WNIT championship in 1984 and later made their first appearance in the NCAA tournament in 1986 while finishing the season ranked No. 20. The Vanderbilt women soon became one of the top SEC teams and were consistently ranked nationally. Coach Jim Foster (1992–2002) brought the Vanderbilt women to new heights and national prominence with his hiring. Vanderbilt advanced to the Sweet Sixteen in the NCAA tournament in eight of his 11 seasons. In 1993, the Commodores were able to advance to the Final Four before falling to eventual champion Texas Tech. Vanderbilt managed to receive a No.1 ranking in the poll taken before the tournament. Foster's teams also won three SEC Tournaments in 1993, 1995, and 2002. Melanie Balcomb became Vanderbilt's fourth coach in May 2002. She has taken the Commodores to the NCAA tournament in each of her six seasons and added SEC Tournament titles in 2004 and 2007.

The Commodores have an overall record of 623–307 record entering the 2007–08 season. Their Memorial Gymnasium all-time mark is 344–81. The Commodores have appeared in 20 NCAA tournaments (third most in the SEC) and have 12 Sweet Sixteen appearances.

=== Football ===
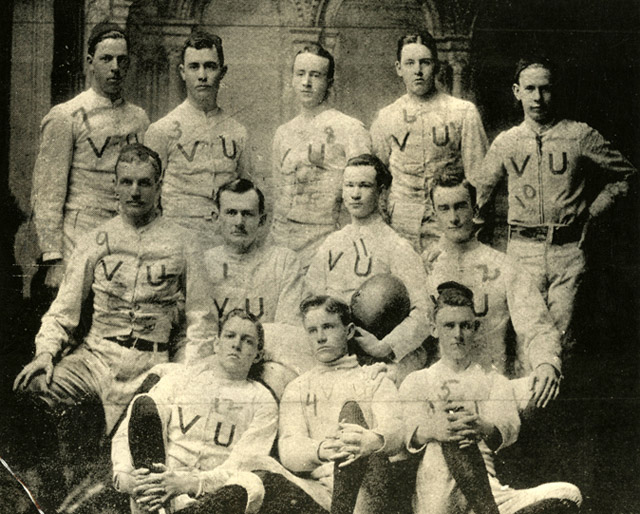
Vanderbilt Commodores football team of 1890

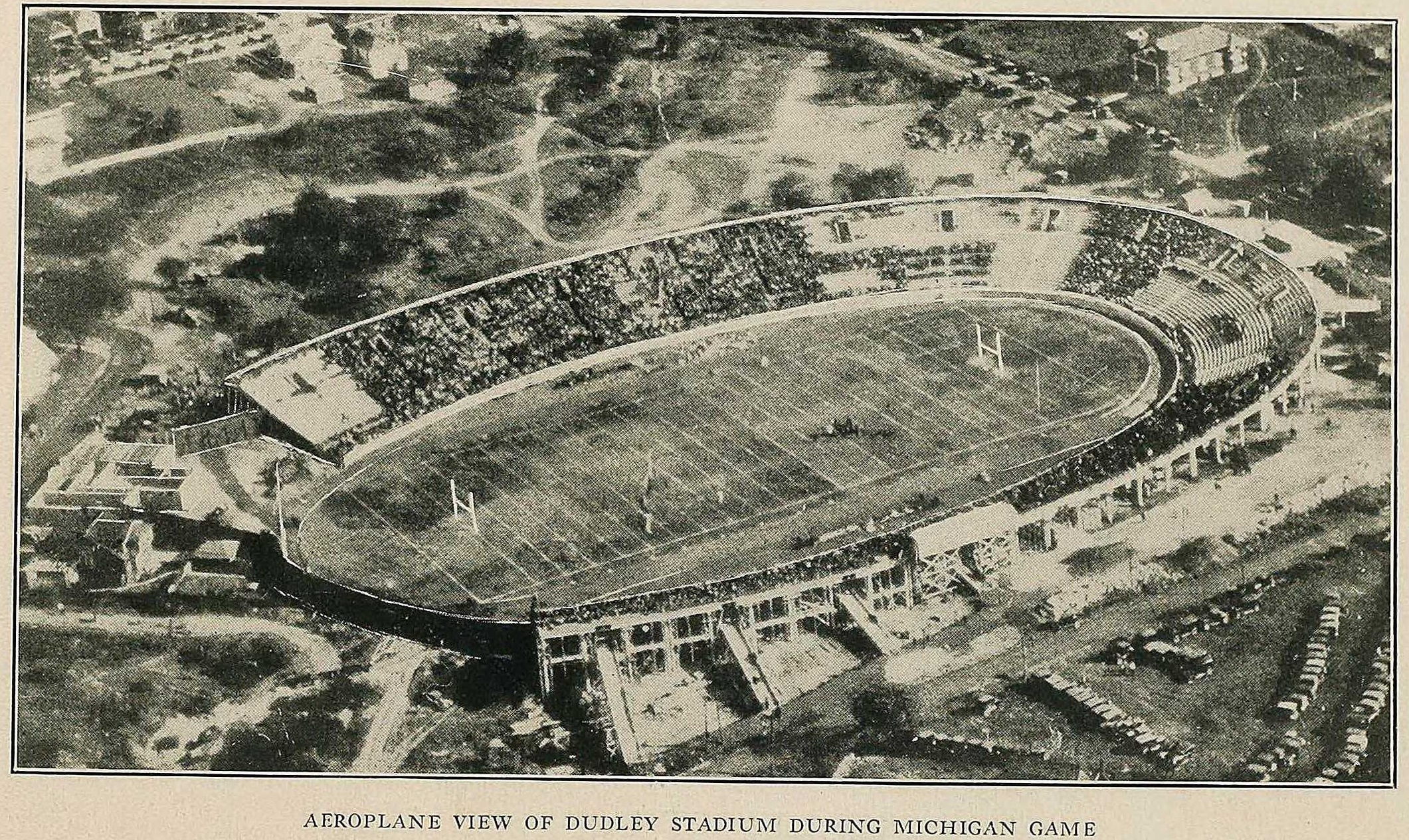
Dudley Field from the sky on October 14, 1922, during its first game between the Vanderbilt Commodores and Michigan Wolverines

The first game in Vanderbilt Commodores football history was in 1890 when they met the University of Nashville. Four years later, Vanderbilt became one of the seven founding members of the Southern Intercollegiate Athletic Association. During those years, Vanderbilt was often a major player in southern football dominating many teams. In 1932, Vandy became a founding member of the Southeastern Conference (SEC). The original teams of the SEC consisted of Alabama, Florida, Kentucky, Georgia, Ole Miss, Tennessee, Mississippi State, LSU, Auburn, Sewanee, Tulane, and Georgia Tech. Vanderbilt's primary rivalries consist of the Tennessee Volunteers and the Ole Miss Rebels.

In Vanderbilt Commodores football history, there have been several coaches who have been honored with College Football Hall of Fame honors. Some of those coaches often returned to the school to continue the success they found there. This list includes Dan McGugin, who coached from 1904 to 1917 and 1919–1934; Ray Morrison, who not only played for the Commodores but also coached for the Commodores from 1936 to 1939; and Red Sanders, who led the Commodores from 1940 to 1942 and 1946–1948, and Paul "Bear" Bryant prior to his becoming head football coach at Alabama. Over the years, Vanderbilt has sent a numerous players to the NFL. One of the most notable football players is Jay Cutler, who served as quarterback and offensive captain for the Commodores. He was selected as the 11th overall pick in the 2006 NFL draft and went on to play for the Denver Broncos and then the Chicago Bears. While at Vanderbilt, he started more than 40 consecutive games and set school records in touchdowns and rushing yards.

=== Women's volleyball ===
Vanderbilt reinstated women's volleyball in the 2025–26 school year (2025 season) after having dropped the sport in spring 1980. This leaves Oklahoma State as the only school in the Power 4 conferences that does not sponsor the sport. In addition, Vanderbilt is the only school in the SEC that does not sponsor softball. The team is coached by Anders Nelson.

== Notable non-varsity sports ==
=== Climbing ===
The rapidly expanding and successful climbing team at Vanderbilt was founded in 2017 and is competing in the Appalachian region of the USA Climbing Collegiate Series. The American collegiate climbing scene has grown by a staggering amount since the advent of modern climbing gyms and the addition of climbing in the Summer Olympic Games. At the 2019 USA Climbing Collegiate National Championships, where over 100 teams attended, Vanderbilt placed 3rd in speed climbing and 13th overall. There are currently over 50 active team members, who compete in all three disciplines - bouldering, speed climbing and lead climbing. The club roster has over 200 undergraduate as well as graduate & professional students.

=== Club baseball ===
Founded in 2008, the Vanderbilt University Club Baseball team competes in the Mid-Atlantic conference of NCBA Division 1 in the West division. In the 2012–2013 season, opponents included clubs in the division (Appalachian State University, UNC Charlotte, University of Kentucky, and University of Tennessee) and others out of conference. The 2012–2013 roster included 26 undergraduate and graduate students, including 12 freshmen and 2 graduating seniors.

=== Rugby ===
Founded in 1970, Vanderbilt University Rugby Football Club plays in the Division 1 Southeastern Collegiate Rugby Conference against its traditional SEC rivals such as Tennessee and Ole Miss. Vanderbilt had previously played in Division 2, where it was one of the stronger teams. Every fall Vanderbilt hosts the Oak Leaf Cup tournament. Vanderbilt is led by head coach James Snell.

=== Rowing ===
Founded in 1985, the Vanderbilt University Rowing team is one of the largest club teams on campus and competes as a member of the Southeastern Intercollegiate Rowing Association (SIRA) and the American Collegiate Rowing Association (ACRA). Coached by former University of Michigan rower Jon Miller, Vanderbilt won ACRA National Championship titles in the Varsity Women's 4+ in 2018 and the Varsity Women's 8+ in 2024 and 2025. Vanderbilt won the Men's Collegiate 4+ race at the Head of the Charles Regatta in 2021 and the Women's Collegiate 4+ in 2023.

== Former sports ==
=== Men's soccer ===
The program was born in 1973 was dropped in 2006. The college cited Title IX as the reason for its decision. However, supporters of the team and some experts on the legislation said this was not necessary. The decision caused outcry, with soccer players making petitions to resurrect the program. It was also revealed that men's soccer had low costs of operation.

== Championships ==
=== NCAA team championships ===
Vanderbilt has won six NCAA team national championships.

Men's (2)

- Baseball (2): 2014, 2019

Women's (4)

- Bowling (3): 2007, 2018, 2023
- Tennis (1): 2015
- see also
  - SEC NCAA team championships
  - List of NCAA schools with the most NCAA Division I championships

=== Other national team championships ===
Below are national team titles that were not bestowed by the NCAA:

Men’s (1)

- Australian rules football (1): 2003

== Program success ==
Vanderbilt's athletics programs have seen more success in recent years, and 2006–2007 was one of the best in the school's athletic history. At one point, seven of Vanderbilt's 16 teams were ranked in the Top 25 of their respective sports. Women's bowling won the NCAA championship, bringing the university its first team championship since the advent of the NCAA. In 2014, the baseball team won its first College World Series over the Virginia Cavaliers. In 2015, the Vanderbilt women's tennis team won its first national championship by defeating the defending champions UCLA Bruins. In 2018, the women's bowling team won its second national championship by defeating the defending champions McKendree University. And in 2019, the baseball team won its second College World Series title.

== Facilities ==
Campus athletic facilities include:

- FirstBank Stadium, seating capacity: 40,350
- Memorial Gymnasium, 14,326
- Hawkins Field, 3,700
- Vanderbilt Soccer/Lacrosse Complex, 2,400
- Brownlee O. Currey Jr. Tennis Center
- Vanderbilt Legends Club of Tennessee (off-campus golf course)

== Relevant literature ==
- Goheen, Barry. 2020 Buzzer Beaters and Memorial Magic: A Memoir of the Vanderbilt Commodores 1987-1989. Mercer University Press.
