= Kermit Goell =

American songwriter and archaeologist (1915–1997)

Kermit Goell (1915 – December 4, 1997) was an American songwriter and archaeologist.

== Biography ==
Born in Brooklyn, Goell received his BSC in agriculture from Cornell University and served in the Army Air Forces during World War II. As an amateur archeologist Goell helped excavate several ancient sites in Turkey with his archeologist sister, Theresa Goell.

"Huggin' and Chalkin'", Goell's song written with Clancy Hayes, was recorded by Kay Kyser, Hoagy Carmichael and Johnny Mercer, and his "One Finger Melody" was a hit for Frank Sinatra. Goell was the lyricist of the 1947 hit Near You with music by Francis Craig. "Near You" was a hit for Craig and his band as well as the Andrews Sisters and pianist Roger Williams a decade later. In 1947 Billboard reported that Goell's lawyers had written to Craig accusing him of portraying himself as the sole author of "Near You". Goell himself was sued later that year over the authorship of "Huggin' and Chalkin'".

Goell wrote a musical, Pocahontas which ran for 12 performances at the Lyric Theatre in Hammersmith in 1963. The President of the Tobacco Institute, George V. Allen refused funding to the musical because he thought the plot "atrocious". Allen wrote in 1962 that he felt depicting Pocahontas as a "drunken brawler in London horrifies my every emotion...If there were historical justification for Goell's version (which I doubt), I prefer to let such realism rest in the musty archives of the British Museum."

== Notable songs ==
- "Near You" (with Francis Craig)
- "Huggin' and Chalkin'" (with Clancy Hayes)
- "One Finger Melody" (with Al Hoffman and Fred Spielman)
