= Beg Your Pardon =

Song by Francis Craig and His Orchestra
- Published: 1947
- Songwriters: Francis Craig, Beasley Smith

"Beg Your Pardon" is a song written by Francis Craig and Beasley Smith and published in 1947 by the Robbins Music Corporation. It was recorded in 1947 by Frankie Carle and His Orchestra for Columbia Records. Another recording of the song was made that year by Francis Craig, the song's author, and the track maintained the #3 position on the U.S. Billboard charts for twenty weeks in 1948 and the #4 position for a further sixteen weeks of that year.

== Recordings ==
- Frankie Carle and His Orchestra (Columbia 38036)
- Art Mooney (MGM 10140)
- Snooky Lanson (Mercury 5109)
- Eddy Howard (Majestic 1320)
- Russ Morgan (Decca 24339)
- Pat Boone on the album Howdy! (1956)

== See also ==
- 1948 in music
