= Bullet Records =

Independent record label

At least five record labels with the name Bullet Records have existed.

== Bullet Records, Nashville, 1946-1952 ==
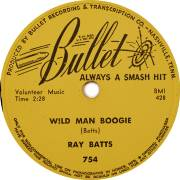
Wild Man Boogie by Ray Bates, Bullet Records 754

The earliest Bullet Records was a record label based in Nashville, United States, which was started in 1946 by Jim Bulleit and C.V. Hitchcock. Bulleit was an early partner in Sun Records. Its only national hits were by orchestra leader Francis Craig. The pop song "Near You" made in early 1947 was a hit, topping the chart for 17 weeks and having a chart run of 25 weeks. Craig also made the charts at No. 3 with "Beg Your Pardon", but no further hits were forthcoming. Despite these hits, the label was known for country music artists such as Boots Woodall's Radio Wranglers, who also recorded for Capitol Records, and Southern Gospel artists such as the Rangers Quartet and Speer Family. The label also recorded blues singer and pianist Cecil Gant. In 1949 they released B. B. King's first commercial single, "Miss Martha King". Too much money was spent in hope of repeating the success of Francis Craig's "Near You" and the label was in trouble by 1949. Jim Bulleit sold out to his share to Hitchcock in February of that year. The label limped on for a few years but was out of business by 1952.

The Bullet, Sur-Speed and Delta catalogs were purchased by Bluesland Productions in the mid-1990s.

== Other Bullet record labels ==
Another label with the same name released In A Moment by the Intrigues, a Philadelphia R&B quartet, in 1969. The song was re-released by Yew Records and became a top-40 hit.

Another Bullet label was a short-lived subsidiary of American Bang Records. Only one album by Peabo Bryson in 1976 was ever released. Bryson's next label Capitol Records now owns the rights to the album Peabo and Bryson's unreleased Bullet material.

The fourth known label with this name was based in England in the early 1980s and released NWOBHM artists. Among known releases is the self-titled 1983 debut EP from Danish Pretty Maids. Bullet Records UK was an offshoot of Bullet Mail Order. Because of its close ties with the British heavy metal scene at that time, it seemed a logical progression to form a label to promote little-known unsigned bands. Amongst the bands on the label were Wrathchild, Pretty Maids, Black Rose [from N.E.England], Le Griffe, Crisis (from Salt Lake City, US), Silverwing, Chrome Molly and Taipan [from Australia]. Whilst many of the releases were critically acclaimed, the company suffered from a lack of experience and through various reasons, cash-flow being one, was forced to cease trading in 1984. Bullet Records is currently a Registered Trademark owned by Clark Enslin.

== See also ==
- Lists of record labels
