= McEwen, Tennessee =

- City
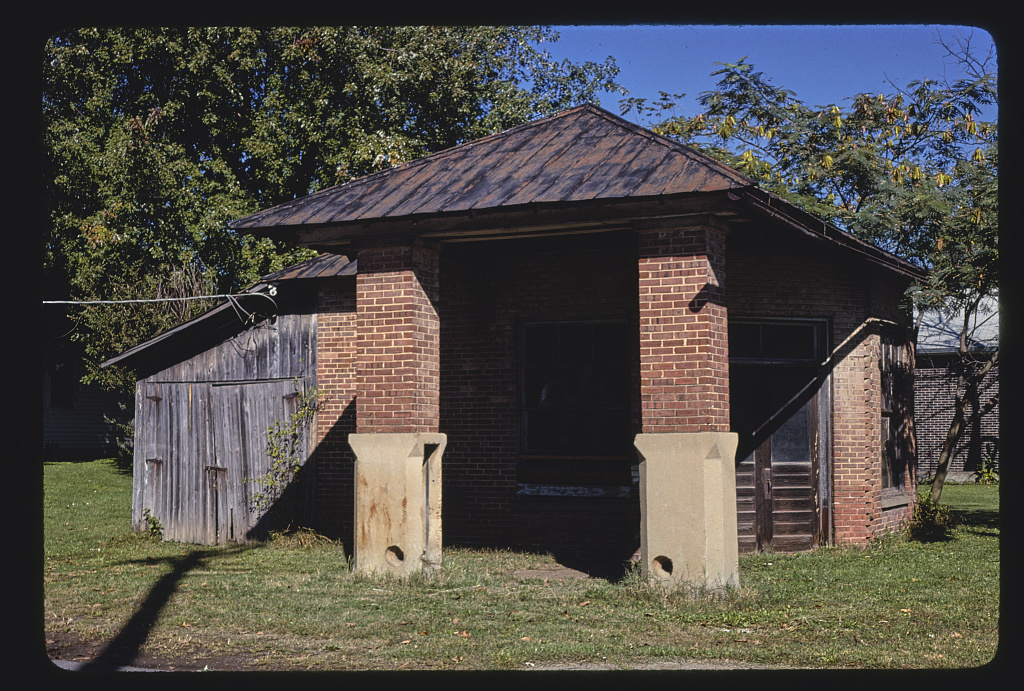

- Location in Humphreys County, Tennessee
- Coordinates: 36°6′32″N 87°38′6″W
- Country: United States
- State: Tennessee
- County: Humphreys

Area
  - Total: 1.84 sq mi (4.77 km^{2})
  - Land: 1.84 sq mi (4.77 km^{2})
  - Water: 0 sq mi (0.00 km^{2})
- Elevation: 830 ft (253 m)

Population (2020)
  - Total: 1,643
  - Density: 891.6/sq mi (344.25/km^{2})
- Time zone: UTC-6 (Central (CST))
  - Summer (DST): UTC-5 (CDT)
- ZIP code: 37101
- Area code: 931
- FIPS code: 47-44840
- GNIS feature ID: 1293272
- Website: https://cityofmcewen.com/

McEwen is a city in Humphreys County, Tennessee, United States. As of the 2020 census, McEwen had a population of 1,643.

In December 2022, a dehydrated human heart was found inside one of the salt piles of the Tennessee Department of Transportation; the case remains unresolved.

== Geography ==
McEwen is located in eastern Humphreys County at 36°6′32″N 87°38′6″W (36.108810, -87.634974). U.S. Route 70 passes through the center of the city, leading east 14 miles (23 km) to Dickson and west 9 miles (14 km) to Waverly, the Humphreys county seat. Tennessee State Route 231 (Main Street) leads north 18 miles (29 km) to Erin.

According to the United States Census Bureau, McEwen has a total area of 1.9 square miles (4.8 km^{2}), of which 1,408 square metres (0.3 acres), or 0.03%, are water.

== Demographics ==
Historical population
Census	Pop.	Note	%±
1890	213		—
1910	661		—
1920	635		−3.9%
1930	620		−2.4%
1940	617		−0.5%
1950	710		15.1%
1960	979		37.9%
1970	1,237		26.4%
1980	1,352		9.3%
1990	1,442		6.7%
2000	1,702		18.0%
2010	1,750		2.8%
2020	1,643		−6.1%

=== 2020 census ===
As of the 2020 census, McEwen had a population of 1,643. The median age was 41.6 years. 22.3% of residents were under the age of 18 and 19.2% of residents were 65 years of age or older. For every 100 females there were 92.4 males, and for every 100 females age 18 and over there were 84.3 males age 18 and over.

0.0% of residents lived in urban areas, while 100.0% lived in rural areas.

There were 709 households in McEwen, of which 29.9% had children under the age of 18 living in them. Of all households, 38.9% were married-couple households, 19.3% were households with a male householder and no spouse or partner present, and 34.4% were households with a female householder and no spouse or partner present. About 32.0% of all households were made up of individuals and 14.8% had someone living alone who was 65 years of age or older.

There were 807 housing units, of which 12.1% were vacant. The homeowner vacancy rate was 2.7% and the rental vacancy rate was 7.7%.

Racial composition as of the 2020 census
Race	Number	Percent
White	1,532	93.2%
Black or African American	9	0.5%
American Indian and Alaska Native	4	0.2%
Asian	6	0.4%
Native Hawaiian and Other Pacific Islander	0	0.0%
Some other race	5	0.3%
Two or more races	87	5.3%
Hispanic or Latino (of any race)	33	2.0%

=== 2000 census ===
As of the census of 2000, there was a population of 1,702, with 725 households and 476 families residing in the city. The population density was 892.1 inhabitants per square mile (344.4/km^{2}). There were 775 housing units at an average density of 406.2 per square mile (156.8/km^{2}). The racial makeup of the city was 98.65% White, 0.35% African American, 0.18% Native American, 0.06% Asian, 0.06% Pacific Islander, 0.12% from other races, and 0.59% from two or more races. Hispanic or Latino of any race were 0.53% of the population.

There were 725 households, out of which 30.8% had children under the age of 18 living with them, 51.0% were married couples living together, 10.6% had a female householder with no husband present, and 34.3% were non-families. 30.5% of all households were made up of individuals, and 14.3% had someone living alone who was 65 years of age or older. The average household size was 2.34 and the average family size was 2.92.

In the city, the population was spread out, with 25.6% under the age of 18, 7.9% from 18 to 24, 27.7% from 25 to 44, 23.1% from 45 to 64, and 15.7% who were 65 years of age or older. The median age was 37 years. For every 100 females, there were 87.9 males. For every 100 females age 18 and over, there were 81.9 males.

The median income for a household in the city was $30,682, and the median income for a family was $39,167. Males had a median income of $30,417 versus $22,109 for females. The per capita income for the city was $17,375. About 11.2% of families and 15.8% of the population were below the poverty line, including 20.0% of those under age 18 and 14.3% of those age 65 or over.

== Culture ==
McEwen is the home of the Irish Picnic, a fundraiser for the local St. Patrick Church and School. It was established in 1854 and was recognised in 1988 by the Guinness Book of World Records as "The World's Largest Outdoor Barbecue". The event is held annually on the last Friday and Saturday in July.

== Human heart mystery ==
In December 2022, local workers discovered a dehydrated human heart in a Tennessee Department of Transportation salt pile in Humphreys County. The heart was analyzed, and the only thing that could be determined was that the heart belonged to an adult male. As of December 2023, no body has been found and the case remains unsolved.

== Notable residents ==
- Russ Craft, NFL player
- Ralph Emery, country music disc jockey and television host
- Daryl Mosley, bluegrass musician
- Beasley Smith, composer and big-band musician
