= Beasley Smith =

- Born: John Beasley Smith; September 27, 1901; McEwen, Tennessee, U.S.
- Died: May 14, 1968 (aged 66) Nashville, Tennessee, U.S.
- Occupations: Composer; big band musician; radio director; band director/arranger
- Years active: 1922-?
- Formerly of: Beasley Smith and his Orchestra

John Beasley Smith (September 27, 1901 – May 14, 1968) was an American composer and big band musician. "That Lucky Old Sun" (1949) one of his better known works, was covered by many well-known artists. He often worked with Haven Gillespie and toured the nation with his group, Beasley Smith and His Orchestra.

== Biography ==
Beasley Smith was born in McEwen, Tennessee. His parents were teachers. The family moved to Nashville when he was in elementary school. Smith attended Hume-Fogg High School, where he formed an instrumental duo with fellow piano prodigy Francis Craig. They both attended Vanderbilt University, where they were roommates, but Smith left college after two years to pursue a career as a musician.

Smith formed his first band, the Beasley Smith Orchestra, around 1922. By 1925 the group was entertaining regularly at the Andrew Jackson Hotel in downtown Nashville, and on October 5, 1925, both Smith and Craig performed with their bands during radio station WSM's opening-day broadcasts. From 1927 to 1933, the group toured nationally. Lead vocalists who worked with Smith's band during his heyday included Snooky Lanson, Dottie Dillard, Kitty Kallen, and Dinah Shore.

In 1933, Smith accepted the job of music director at WSM, and starred on such radio shows as Mr. Smith Goes to Town, Sunday Down South and Tin Pan Valley.

When Nashville started to become a recording center in the 1940s, Smith and Owen Bradley were key figures in assembling musicians for studio sessions for producers such as Decca Records' Paul Cohen. During this time, Smith started having success as a songwriter. He and Owen Bradley co-wrote "Night Train to Memphis" with Marvin Hughes. Roy Acuff sang the original version in 1942, and the upbeat song has been recorded consistently ever since. Beasley Smith and Francis Craig co-wrote "Beg Your Pardon," and it became the 1948 follow-up hit to "Near You" for Craig's band. "That Lucky Old Sun" (1949), co-written with Haven Gillespie was a million-seller for Frankie Laine and is now considered a pop-music standard. In his lifetime, Smith wrote more than 100 songs.

In 1953, Smith left WSM to become the A&R director and musical arranger for Dot Records. He and Dot's founder, Randy Wood, also incorporated the Randy-Smith Music Publishing Company.

Beasley Smith died in Nashville, Tennessee in 1968.

In 1983, Beasley Smith was inducted into the Nashville Songwriters Hall of Fame.
