= Spirit of Gold Marching Band =

Marching band of Vanderbilt University

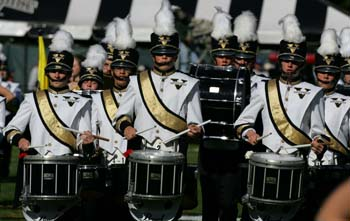
- School: Vanderbilt University
- Location: Nashville, Tennessee, USA
- Conference: Southeastern Conference
- Founded: 1920
- Director: Dr. Douglas Morin
- Assistant Director: Clark Hubbard
- Members: approx. 110
- Fight song: "Dynamite"

The Spirit of Gold Marching Band is the collegiate marching band organized by Vanderbilt University.

== Membership ==
A unique feature of the Spirit of Gold is that membership in the marching band is open to all students enrolled at Vanderbilt as well as students from other colleges in the Nashville area. This includes Belmont, Lipscomb, Trevecca, Vol State and Nashville State. This does not apply to Tennessee State University as they already have their own marching band, the Aristocrat of Bands, nor to Fisk University who re-started their marching band in 2020 after a long hiatus.

== Performances ==
=== Football ===
The band forms the core of the student section at intercollegiate football games hosted by Vanderbilt at FirstBank Stadium and performs at all Vanderbilt Commodores home football games, as well as one away game per season and any post-season games.

The band has developed many traditions that help add to the atmosphere of Southeastern Conference football on game day. For example, the band leads the football team into every game day during Star Walk, performs for fans in Vandyville (the tailgating area outside FirstBank Stadium), and provides music for pre-game and in-game spirit. The band plays the university's fight song, "Dynamite", throughout the game as well.

The Spirit of Gold prepares a unique halftime show for every home game, performing from variety of musical genres and eras. Recent performances have featured music from Olivia Rodrigo, Fall Out Boy, John Williams, Earth, Wind, and Fire, and Bruno Mars.

=== Basketball, Anchor of Sound ===
Starting in October of each year, a 50-60-piece pep band is formed for performances at Vanderbilt's men's and women's basketball games played in Memorial Gym. Members of the Anchor of Sound are divided into two bands, Black Band and Gold Band, each band playing at the same number of regular-season games. The Anchor of Sound, like the Spirit of Gold, travels to any post-season games for both men's and women's basketball. Anchor of Sound performs music similar to that which Spirit of Gold performs.

=== Additional Performances ===
In addition to their respective regular-season games, the Spirit of Gold performs at select home women's soccer games, while the Anchor of Sound performs at select home women's lacrosse games.

== Tau Beta Sigma ==
The Eta Phi chapter of Tau Beta Sigma serves the Spirit of Gold. The co-ed chapter consists of approximately 25 members, and, in 2009, received the Grace and A. Frank Martin Chapter Leadership Award, a biennial award that honors the outstanding chapter in the nation. All members of the Spirit of Gold, regardless of university, are able to seek membership in Eta Phi.
