= Near You =

1947 song by Francis Craig and Kermit Goell

Single by Francis Craig and His Orchestra
- A-side: "Red Rose"
- Published: July 25, 1947 by Supreme Music Corp., New York
- Released: March 1947
- Recorded: February 15, 1947
- Studio: Castle Studio, Nashville
- Genre: Traditional pop, popular music, big band
- Length: 2:29
- Label: Bullet 1001
- Composer: Francis Craig
- Lyricist: Kermit Goell

"Near You" is a popular song written and originally recorded by Francis Craig and His Orchestra at Castle Studio in 1947, with lyrics by Kermit Goell, which became a pop standard.

== Background ==
The recording by Francis Craig (the song's composer) with orchestra member Bob Lamm on vocals was released by Bullet Records as catalog number 1001. It first reached the Billboard Best Sellers chart on August 30, 1947, and lasted 21 weeks on the chart, peaking at number one. On the "Most Played By Jockeys" chart, the song spent 17 consecutive weeks at number one, setting a record for both the song and the artist with most consecutive weeks in the number-one position on a US pop music chart. Billboard ranked it as the No. 1 song overall for 1947.

In 2009, hip-hop group The Black Eyed Peas surpassed Craig's record for artist with most consecutive weeks in the number-one position (26) with the songs "Boom Boom Pow" (12 weeks) and "I Gotta Feeling" (14 weeks).

In 2019, "Old Town Road", by Lil Nas X featuring Billy Ray Cyrus, surpassed "Near You" for song with most consecutive weeks in the number-one position with 19 weeks.

== George Jones and Tammy Wynette ==
"Near You"

Single by George Jones and Tammy Wynette

from the album Golden Ring
- B-side: "Tattletale Eyes"
- Released: November 1976 (US)
- Recorded: December 12, 1974
- Genre: Country
- Length: 2:21
- Label: Epic 50314
- Songwriters: Francis Craig, Kermit Goell
- Producer: Billy Sherrill

George Jones and Tammy Wynette singles chronology
"Golden Ring" (1976)	"Near You" (1976)	"Southern California" (1977)

In 1977, "Near You" became a number-one country hit as a duet for the duo of George Jones and Tammy Wynette. Recorded in the winter of 1974, it was their second consecutive number 1 single since their divorce in 1975; they had only managed to top the charts once during their six-year marriage with "We're Gonna Hold On" in 1973.

== Other versions ==
Other recordings of the song that charted on the Billboard best seller in 1947 include:

- The Andrews Sisters (Decca Records catalog number 24171) entered the chart on October 3 and peaked at number four.
- Elliot Lawrence (Columbia Records catalog number 37838) entered the chart on October 3 and peaked at number nine. This was Lawrence's only charting hit.
- Larry Green (RCA Victor Records catalog number 20-2421) entered the chart on October 10 and peaked at number three.
- Two Ton Baker (Mercury Records catalog number 5066) entered the chart at the same time as Green, and peaked at number twelve, staying for five weeks.
- Alvino Rey (Capitol Records catalog number 452) entered the chart on October 17 and peaked at number nine in its only week on the chart. This was Rey's last charting hit.
- Roger Williams recorded the song in 1958, and it charted on the Billboard Hot 100 singles chart, peaking at number 10.

== Popular culture ==
- "Near You" was used by Milton Berle as the closing song on his Texaco Star Theater, and it became his theme song for many years thereafter.
