= Dynamite (fight song) =

Vanderbilt University fight song

Song
- Released: 1938
- Songwriter: Francis Craig

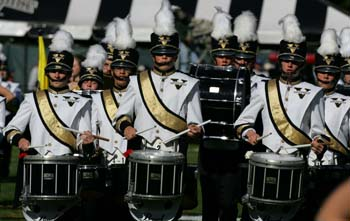
The Spirit of Gold Marching Band plays "Dynamite"

"Dynamite" is the official fight song of Vanderbilt University. It was written in 1938 by Vanderbilt alumni Francis Craig a week prior to a football game between Vanderbilt and the University of Tennessee. It is played at football games, basketball games, and at other Commodore sports events.

== Traditions ==
The fight song is traditionally played at the beginning of home football games when the Vanderbilt Commodores football team runs through the "V" formed by the Spirit of Gold Marching Band, when Vandy scores, Vandy forces a turnover and at the end of the game just before the playing of the Vanderbilt University alma mater.

During basketball games, the fight song is played when the team runs out onto the court, shortened versions are played during timeouts, and the whole song is played immediately after the game concludes.

Recently, students have begun using the "V-U hand signal" during the fight song while they spell "V-A-N-D-Y!" and chant the end of the cheer.
