= Candice Storey Lee =

American college sports administrator

Current position
- Title: Athletic director
- Team: Vanderbilt
- Conference: SEC

Biographical details
- Born: Madison, Alabama, U.S.

Playing career
- 1996–2002: Vanderbilt

Administrative career (AD unless noted)
- 2020–present: Vanderbilt

Candice Storey Lee is the current director of athletics for Vanderbilt University.

== Playing career and education ==
Lee attended college at Vanderbilt, where she played on the school's women's basketball team, suffering two major injuries. A team captain, Lee was part of the SEC Tournament championship team in her final season (2002).

She is a triple alumna of the university, having received a bachelor's degree, a master's degree in counseling, and a doctorate in higher education administration there. She graduated from Vanderbilt with a Bachelor of Science degree in human and organizational development in 2000, received her master’s degree in counseling in 2002 and her doctorate in higher education administration in 2012.

== Career at Vanderbilt ==
Lee began her athletics administration career at Vanderbilt in 2002, serving first as an academic adviser and then compliance director. Working under the late athletic director David Williams, Lee was named the department’s senior woman administrator in 2004, a responsibility she held until 2020. She also assumed the title of deputy athletic director in 2016, overseeing the day-to-day operations of the athletic department and serving as the sport administrator for football and women’s basketball.

When she was hired as Vanderbilt AD, Lee became the first woman, and first Black woman, to lead a Southeastern Conference Athletic Department.

During Lee’s time at Vanderbilt Athletics, student-athletes have won six national championships in baseball (two), bowling (three) and women’s tennis. Vanderbilt teams have also won more than 20 conference championships and tournament titles, including baseball, men’s and women’s basketball, bowling, women’s cross country, men’s and women’s golf, women’s lacrosse, women’s soccer and women’s tennis. Additionally, the football team has played in six bowl games since breaking a 26-year bowl drought in 2008.
