= Francis Craig =

American songwriter (1900–1966)

- Born: September 10, 1900; Dickson, Tennessee, U.S.
- Died: November 19, 1966 (aged 66) Sewanee, Tennessee, U.S.
- Occupations: Composer; big band musician; band director/arranger
- Formerly of: Francis Craig Orchestra

Francis Craig (September 10, 1900 – November 19, 1966) was an American songwriter, honky tonk piano player, and leader of a Nashville dance band. His works included "Dynamite" and "Near You", the latter being the first Billboard #1 hit out of Nashville.

== Early years ==
A Methodist minister's son, Craig was born in Dickson, Tennessee, United States. Craig attended Hume-Fogg High School, where he formed an instrumental duo with fellow piano prodigy Beasley Smith. They both attended Vanderbilt University, where they were roommates. While at Vanderbilt, Craig studied mathematics and political science, "Dynamite", now the official fight song of Vanderbilt University, was written by Craig in 1938 a week prior to a Vanderbilt/University of Tennessee football game. It is played mainly at football games, basketball games, and at other Commodore sports events.

While he was at Vanderbilt, Craig formed an orchestra, the Vanderbilt Jazz Band. When the university's chancellor told Craig he would have to change the name of the group, disband it, or leave Vanderbilt, he dropped out and changed the orchestra's name.

== Radio ==
Craig had three stints on WSM radio in Nashville, Tennessee. His Francis Craig Orchestra played on the station in 1926-1928 and again in 1935-1939. He returned to the station in 1947 to work as a disc jockey on the program Featured by Francis Craig. He also worked on WGN in Chicago, Illinois, in 1940.

== Recording ==
His own recording of "Near You", was released by Bullet Records as catalog number 1001B (The "A" side, 1001A, was titled "Red Rose", also by Craig). "Near You" first reached the Billboard Best Seller chart on August 30, 1947, and lasted 21 weeks on the chart, peaking at No. 1. It held the top spot for 12 straight weeks. (A 2004 article in Billboard says that the song "was No. 1 for 17 weeks in 1947.") It eventually sold over 2.5 million copies.

"Craig's version of the song was the first pop hit record ever to come out of Nashville, Tennessee." Various recordings by other persons have followed.

Other works included "Beg Your Pardon" with Beasley Smith.

== Death ==
Craig died aged 66 in November 1966, in Sewanee, Tennessee.
